

353001–353100 

|-bgcolor=#E9E9E9
| 353001 ||  || — || January 29, 2009 || Kitt Peak || Spacewatch || — || align=right | 2.2 km || 
|-id=002 bgcolor=#E9E9E9
| 353002 ||  || — || January 29, 2009 || Kitt Peak || Spacewatch || — || align=right data-sort-value="0.85" | 850 m || 
|-id=003 bgcolor=#E9E9E9
| 353003 ||  || — || January 30, 2009 || Mount Lemmon || Mount Lemmon Survey || — || align=right | 1.1 km || 
|-id=004 bgcolor=#E9E9E9
| 353004 ||  || — || January 30, 2009 || Kitt Peak || Spacewatch || — || align=right | 1.3 km || 
|-id=005 bgcolor=#E9E9E9
| 353005 ||  || — || January 30, 2009 || Kitt Peak || Spacewatch || NEM || align=right | 2.8 km || 
|-id=006 bgcolor=#E9E9E9
| 353006 ||  || — || March 17, 2005 || Mount Lemmon || Mount Lemmon Survey || HOF || align=right | 2.7 km || 
|-id=007 bgcolor=#E9E9E9
| 353007 ||  || — || January 31, 2009 || Kitt Peak || Spacewatch || HOF || align=right | 3.4 km || 
|-id=008 bgcolor=#E9E9E9
| 353008 ||  || — || January 28, 2009 || Catalina || CSS || — || align=right data-sort-value="0.98" | 980 m || 
|-id=009 bgcolor=#E9E9E9
| 353009 ||  || — || January 28, 2009 || Catalina || CSS || RAF || align=right data-sort-value="0.84" | 840 m || 
|-id=010 bgcolor=#E9E9E9
| 353010 ||  || — || January 31, 2009 || Kitt Peak || Spacewatch || NEM || align=right | 2.3 km || 
|-id=011 bgcolor=#E9E9E9
| 353011 ||  || — || January 31, 2009 || Kitt Peak || Spacewatch || — || align=right | 1.1 km || 
|-id=012 bgcolor=#E9E9E9
| 353012 ||  || — || January 31, 2009 || Purple Mountain || PMO NEO || DOR || align=right | 3.1 km || 
|-id=013 bgcolor=#E9E9E9
| 353013 ||  || — || January 31, 2009 || Kitt Peak || Spacewatch || — || align=right | 1.5 km || 
|-id=014 bgcolor=#E9E9E9
| 353014 ||  || — || January 31, 2009 || Kitt Peak || Spacewatch || — || align=right | 1.1 km || 
|-id=015 bgcolor=#E9E9E9
| 353015 ||  || — || January 29, 2009 || Catalina || CSS || JUN || align=right data-sort-value="0.95" | 950 m || 
|-id=016 bgcolor=#E9E9E9
| 353016 ||  || — || January 18, 2009 || Kitt Peak || Spacewatch || MAR || align=right | 1.4 km || 
|-id=017 bgcolor=#E9E9E9
| 353017 ||  || — || January 17, 2009 || Kitt Peak || Spacewatch || — || align=right | 1.5 km || 
|-id=018 bgcolor=#E9E9E9
| 353018 ||  || — || January 16, 2009 || Kitt Peak || Spacewatch || — || align=right | 3.1 km || 
|-id=019 bgcolor=#E9E9E9
| 353019 ||  || — || January 20, 2009 || Kitt Peak || Spacewatch || — || align=right | 1.2 km || 
|-id=020 bgcolor=#E9E9E9
| 353020 ||  || — || January 25, 2009 || Kitt Peak || Spacewatch || — || align=right | 1.5 km || 
|-id=021 bgcolor=#E9E9E9
| 353021 ||  || — || October 6, 2008 || Mount Lemmon || Mount Lemmon Survey || — || align=right | 1.7 km || 
|-id=022 bgcolor=#E9E9E9
| 353022 ||  || — || January 31, 2009 || Kitt Peak || Spacewatch || — || align=right | 2.8 km || 
|-id=023 bgcolor=#E9E9E9
| 353023 ||  || — || January 28, 2009 || Catalina || CSS || — || align=right | 3.9 km || 
|-id=024 bgcolor=#E9E9E9
| 353024 ||  || — || January 20, 2009 || Mount Lemmon || Mount Lemmon Survey || — || align=right | 1.2 km || 
|-id=025 bgcolor=#E9E9E9
| 353025 ||  || — || January 25, 2009 || Socorro || LINEAR || — || align=right | 1.7 km || 
|-id=026 bgcolor=#E9E9E9
| 353026 ||  || — || January 19, 2009 || Catalina || CSS || EUN || align=right | 1.5 km || 
|-id=027 bgcolor=#E9E9E9
| 353027 ||  || — || February 1, 2009 || Mount Lemmon || Mount Lemmon Survey || — || align=right | 2.2 km || 
|-id=028 bgcolor=#E9E9E9
| 353028 ||  || — || February 3, 2009 || Kitt Peak || Spacewatch || — || align=right | 1.3 km || 
|-id=029 bgcolor=#E9E9E9
| 353029 ||  || — || February 2, 2009 || Kitt Peak || Spacewatch || MAR || align=right | 1.4 km || 
|-id=030 bgcolor=#E9E9E9
| 353030 ||  || — || February 1, 2009 || Kitt Peak || Spacewatch || KRM || align=right | 2.0 km || 
|-id=031 bgcolor=#E9E9E9
| 353031 ||  || — || February 1, 2009 || Kitt Peak || Spacewatch || — || align=right data-sort-value="0.81" | 810 m || 
|-id=032 bgcolor=#E9E9E9
| 353032 ||  || — || February 1, 2009 || Kitt Peak || Spacewatch || — || align=right | 1.5 km || 
|-id=033 bgcolor=#E9E9E9
| 353033 ||  || — || February 1, 2009 || Kitt Peak || Spacewatch || — || align=right | 1.4 km || 
|-id=034 bgcolor=#E9E9E9
| 353034 ||  || — || February 1, 2009 || Kitt Peak || Spacewatch || — || align=right | 1.7 km || 
|-id=035 bgcolor=#d6d6d6
| 353035 ||  || — || February 1, 2009 || Kitt Peak || Spacewatch || — || align=right | 3.1 km || 
|-id=036 bgcolor=#E9E9E9
| 353036 ||  || — || January 17, 2009 || Kitt Peak || Spacewatch || — || align=right | 1.3 km || 
|-id=037 bgcolor=#E9E9E9
| 353037 ||  || — || February 13, 2009 || Kitt Peak || Spacewatch || — || align=right data-sort-value="0.90" | 900 m || 
|-id=038 bgcolor=#E9E9E9
| 353038 ||  || — || February 14, 2009 || Mount Lemmon || Mount Lemmon Survey || — || align=right data-sort-value="0.91" | 910 m || 
|-id=039 bgcolor=#E9E9E9
| 353039 ||  || — || February 14, 2009 || Kitt Peak || Spacewatch || — || align=right data-sort-value="0.86" | 860 m || 
|-id=040 bgcolor=#E9E9E9
| 353040 ||  || — || February 14, 2009 || Kitt Peak || Spacewatch || — || align=right | 2.4 km || 
|-id=041 bgcolor=#E9E9E9
| 353041 ||  || — || February 14, 2009 || La Sagra || OAM Obs. || — || align=right | 1.2 km || 
|-id=042 bgcolor=#E9E9E9
| 353042 ||  || — || February 14, 2009 || La Sagra || OAM Obs. || — || align=right | 1.3 km || 
|-id=043 bgcolor=#E9E9E9
| 353043 ||  || — || February 5, 2009 || Kitt Peak || Spacewatch || — || align=right | 1.2 km || 
|-id=044 bgcolor=#E9E9E9
| 353044 ||  || — || September 14, 2003 || Palomar || NEAT || — || align=right | 1.5 km || 
|-id=045 bgcolor=#E9E9E9
| 353045 ||  || — || February 18, 2009 || Socorro || LINEAR || — || align=right | 3.2 km || 
|-id=046 bgcolor=#E9E9E9
| 353046 ||  || — || February 20, 2009 || Calvin-Rehoboth || Calvin–Rehoboth Obs. || DOR || align=right | 2.7 km || 
|-id=047 bgcolor=#E9E9E9
| 353047 ||  || — || February 21, 2009 || Mount Lemmon || Mount Lemmon Survey || — || align=right | 2.5 km || 
|-id=048 bgcolor=#E9E9E9
| 353048 ||  || — || February 17, 2009 || Socorro || LINEAR || — || align=right | 1.0 km || 
|-id=049 bgcolor=#d6d6d6
| 353049 ||  || — || February 1, 2009 || Kitt Peak || Spacewatch || — || align=right | 3.1 km || 
|-id=050 bgcolor=#E9E9E9
| 353050 ||  || — || February 20, 2009 || Kitt Peak || Spacewatch || — || align=right | 3.1 km || 
|-id=051 bgcolor=#E9E9E9
| 353051 ||  || — || February 19, 2009 || La Sagra || OAM Obs. || — || align=right | 2.0 km || 
|-id=052 bgcolor=#E9E9E9
| 353052 ||  || — || February 18, 2009 || La Sagra || OAM Obs. || — || align=right | 1.0 km || 
|-id=053 bgcolor=#E9E9E9
| 353053 ||  || — || January 25, 2009 || Kitt Peak || Spacewatch || — || align=right | 2.2 km || 
|-id=054 bgcolor=#E9E9E9
| 353054 ||  || — || February 19, 2009 || Kitt Peak || Spacewatch || — || align=right | 2.0 km || 
|-id=055 bgcolor=#E9E9E9
| 353055 ||  || — || February 19, 2009 || Kitt Peak || Spacewatch || PAD || align=right | 2.1 km || 
|-id=056 bgcolor=#E9E9E9
| 353056 ||  || — || February 22, 2009 || Kitt Peak || Spacewatch || — || align=right | 1.8 km || 
|-id=057 bgcolor=#E9E9E9
| 353057 ||  || — || February 22, 2009 || Kitt Peak || Spacewatch || HEN || align=right data-sort-value="0.83" | 830 m || 
|-id=058 bgcolor=#E9E9E9
| 353058 ||  || — || February 22, 2009 || Kitt Peak || Spacewatch || PAD || align=right | 1.7 km || 
|-id=059 bgcolor=#E9E9E9
| 353059 ||  || — || February 22, 2009 || Kitt Peak || Spacewatch || MRX || align=right | 1.1 km || 
|-id=060 bgcolor=#E9E9E9
| 353060 ||  || — || February 22, 2009 || Kitt Peak || Spacewatch || — || align=right | 2.7 km || 
|-id=061 bgcolor=#fefefe
| 353061 ||  || — || February 22, 2009 || Kitt Peak || Spacewatch || — || align=right | 3.4 km || 
|-id=062 bgcolor=#E9E9E9
| 353062 ||  || — || February 24, 2009 || Mount Lemmon || Mount Lemmon Survey || — || align=right | 1.2 km || 
|-id=063 bgcolor=#E9E9E9
| 353063 ||  || — || February 26, 2009 || Catalina || CSS || — || align=right | 2.3 km || 
|-id=064 bgcolor=#E9E9E9
| 353064 ||  || — || February 19, 2009 || La Sagra || OAM Obs. || ADE || align=right | 3.1 km || 
|-id=065 bgcolor=#E9E9E9
| 353065 ||  || — || February 21, 2009 || Mount Lemmon || Mount Lemmon Survey || — || align=right data-sort-value="0.91" | 910 m || 
|-id=066 bgcolor=#E9E9E9
| 353066 ||  || — || February 22, 2009 || La Sagra || OAM Obs. || — || align=right | 1.9 km || 
|-id=067 bgcolor=#E9E9E9
| 353067 ||  || — || February 21, 2009 || Kitt Peak || Spacewatch || — || align=right | 1.0 km || 
|-id=068 bgcolor=#E9E9E9
| 353068 ||  || — || February 21, 2009 || Kitt Peak || Spacewatch || — || align=right | 1.5 km || 
|-id=069 bgcolor=#E9E9E9
| 353069 ||  || — || February 24, 2009 || Kitt Peak || Spacewatch || — || align=right | 1.7 km || 
|-id=070 bgcolor=#E9E9E9
| 353070 ||  || — || February 24, 2009 || Kitt Peak || Spacewatch || — || align=right | 2.0 km || 
|-id=071 bgcolor=#E9E9E9
| 353071 ||  || — || February 24, 2009 || Kitt Peak || Spacewatch || — || align=right | 1.6 km || 
|-id=072 bgcolor=#E9E9E9
| 353072 ||  || — || February 27, 2009 || Kitt Peak || Spacewatch || — || align=right | 2.3 km || 
|-id=073 bgcolor=#E9E9E9
| 353073 ||  || — || February 27, 2009 || Kitt Peak || Spacewatch || — || align=right | 1.5 km || 
|-id=074 bgcolor=#E9E9E9
| 353074 ||  || — || February 27, 2009 || Kitt Peak || Spacewatch || — || align=right | 2.6 km || 
|-id=075 bgcolor=#E9E9E9
| 353075 ||  || — || February 28, 2009 || Mount Lemmon || Mount Lemmon Survey || fast? || align=right | 2.7 km || 
|-id=076 bgcolor=#E9E9E9
| 353076 ||  || — || February 28, 2009 || Kitt Peak || Spacewatch || — || align=right | 2.9 km || 
|-id=077 bgcolor=#E9E9E9
| 353077 ||  || — || February 28, 2009 || Hibiscus || N. Teamo || — || align=right | 1.5 km || 
|-id=078 bgcolor=#E9E9E9
| 353078 ||  || — || February 26, 2009 || Kitt Peak || Spacewatch || — || align=right | 1.9 km || 
|-id=079 bgcolor=#E9E9E9
| 353079 ||  || — || February 26, 2009 || Kitt Peak || Spacewatch || MIS || align=right | 2.9 km || 
|-id=080 bgcolor=#E9E9E9
| 353080 ||  || — || February 26, 2009 || Kitt Peak || Spacewatch || — || align=right | 2.5 km || 
|-id=081 bgcolor=#E9E9E9
| 353081 ||  || — || February 26, 2009 || Kitt Peak || Spacewatch || — || align=right | 2.3 km || 
|-id=082 bgcolor=#E9E9E9
| 353082 ||  || — || February 26, 2009 || Kitt Peak || Spacewatch || — || align=right | 2.0 km || 
|-id=083 bgcolor=#E9E9E9
| 353083 ||  || — || February 27, 2009 || Catalina || CSS || — || align=right | 1.1 km || 
|-id=084 bgcolor=#E9E9E9
| 353084 ||  || — || February 24, 2009 || Catalina || CSS || HNS || align=right | 1.4 km || 
|-id=085 bgcolor=#E9E9E9
| 353085 ||  || — || February 26, 2009 || Catalina || CSS || — || align=right | 1.8 km || 
|-id=086 bgcolor=#E9E9E9
| 353086 ||  || — || February 26, 2009 || Mount Lemmon || Mount Lemmon Survey || MAR || align=right | 1.2 km || 
|-id=087 bgcolor=#E9E9E9
| 353087 ||  || — || February 26, 2009 || Catalina || CSS || — || align=right data-sort-value="0.85" | 850 m || 
|-id=088 bgcolor=#E9E9E9
| 353088 ||  || — || February 27, 2009 || Kitt Peak || Spacewatch || — || align=right | 1.6 km || 
|-id=089 bgcolor=#E9E9E9
| 353089 ||  || — || February 27, 2009 || Kitt Peak || Spacewatch || — || align=right | 1.5 km || 
|-id=090 bgcolor=#E9E9E9
| 353090 ||  || — || February 28, 2009 || Kitt Peak || Spacewatch || — || align=right | 2.1 km || 
|-id=091 bgcolor=#E9E9E9
| 353091 ||  || — || February 28, 2009 || Kitt Peak || Spacewatch || PAD || align=right | 1.7 km || 
|-id=092 bgcolor=#E9E9E9
| 353092 ||  || — || February 25, 2009 || Siding Spring || SSS || — || align=right | 2.4 km || 
|-id=093 bgcolor=#E9E9E9
| 353093 ||  || — || February 27, 2009 || Catalina || CSS || — || align=right | 1.8 km || 
|-id=094 bgcolor=#d6d6d6
| 353094 ||  || — || February 19, 2009 || Kitt Peak || Spacewatch || HYG || align=right | 2.8 km || 
|-id=095 bgcolor=#d6d6d6
| 353095 ||  || — || February 19, 2009 || Kitt Peak || Spacewatch || KOR || align=right | 1.2 km || 
|-id=096 bgcolor=#E9E9E9
| 353096 ||  || — || March 2, 2009 || Kitt Peak || Spacewatch || WIT || align=right | 1.3 km || 
|-id=097 bgcolor=#fefefe
| 353097 ||  || — || March 15, 2009 || Kitt Peak || Spacewatch || — || align=right | 1.1 km || 
|-id=098 bgcolor=#E9E9E9
| 353098 ||  || — || March 15, 2009 || Kitt Peak || Spacewatch || — || align=right data-sort-value="0.91" | 910 m || 
|-id=099 bgcolor=#E9E9E9
| 353099 ||  || — || March 15, 2009 || Kitt Peak || Spacewatch || DOR || align=right | 2.4 km || 
|-id=100 bgcolor=#E9E9E9
| 353100 ||  || — || March 15, 2009 || Kitt Peak || Spacewatch || — || align=right | 1.9 km || 
|}

353101–353200 

|-bgcolor=#E9E9E9
| 353101 ||  || — || March 15, 2009 || Kitt Peak || Spacewatch || NEM || align=right | 2.6 km || 
|-id=102 bgcolor=#E9E9E9
| 353102 ||  || — || March 15, 2009 || Catalina || CSS || — || align=right | 1.5 km || 
|-id=103 bgcolor=#d6d6d6
| 353103 ||  || — || October 25, 2001 || Apache Point || SDSS || — || align=right | 2.3 km || 
|-id=104 bgcolor=#E9E9E9
| 353104 ||  || — || March 3, 2009 || Kitt Peak || Spacewatch || WIT || align=right | 1.4 km || 
|-id=105 bgcolor=#d6d6d6
| 353105 ||  || — || March 1, 2009 || Kitt Peak || Spacewatch || THM || align=right | 3.4 km || 
|-id=106 bgcolor=#E9E9E9
| 353106 ||  || — || March 15, 2009 || Antares || ARO || — || align=right | 2.6 km || 
|-id=107 bgcolor=#d6d6d6
| 353107 ||  || — || March 3, 2009 || Catalina || CSS || — || align=right | 4.6 km || 
|-id=108 bgcolor=#E9E9E9
| 353108 ||  || — || March 17, 2009 || Bisei SG Center || BATTeRS || — || align=right | 2.1 km || 
|-id=109 bgcolor=#d6d6d6
| 353109 ||  || — || March 18, 2009 || Dauban || F. Kugel || — || align=right | 3.0 km || 
|-id=110 bgcolor=#E9E9E9
| 353110 ||  || — || February 16, 2004 || Kitt Peak || Spacewatch || — || align=right | 3.1 km || 
|-id=111 bgcolor=#d6d6d6
| 353111 ||  || — || February 24, 2009 || Kitt Peak || Spacewatch || — || align=right | 2.9 km || 
|-id=112 bgcolor=#E9E9E9
| 353112 ||  || — || March 16, 2009 || Kitt Peak || Spacewatch || — || align=right | 1.5 km || 
|-id=113 bgcolor=#E9E9E9
| 353113 ||  || — || March 16, 2009 || Dauban || F. Kugel || — || align=right | 1.7 km || 
|-id=114 bgcolor=#d6d6d6
| 353114 ||  || — || March 20, 2009 || Vicques || M. Ory || — || align=right | 5.9 km || 
|-id=115 bgcolor=#E9E9E9
| 353115 ||  || — || March 17, 2009 || Kitt Peak || Spacewatch || — || align=right | 2.2 km || 
|-id=116 bgcolor=#d6d6d6
| 353116 ||  || — || March 21, 2009 || Vicques || M. Ory || — || align=right | 3.5 km || 
|-id=117 bgcolor=#E9E9E9
| 353117 ||  || — || March 20, 2009 || La Sagra || OAM Obs. || — || align=right | 2.8 km || 
|-id=118 bgcolor=#E9E9E9
| 353118 ||  || — || March 20, 2009 || La Sagra || OAM Obs. || — || align=right | 3.0 km || 
|-id=119 bgcolor=#d6d6d6
| 353119 ||  || — || March 1, 2009 || Kitt Peak || Spacewatch || KOR || align=right | 1.8 km || 
|-id=120 bgcolor=#d6d6d6
| 353120 ||  || — || March 24, 2009 || Mount Lemmon || Mount Lemmon Survey || — || align=right | 3.0 km || 
|-id=121 bgcolor=#E9E9E9
| 353121 ||  || — || March 24, 2009 || Mount Lemmon || Mount Lemmon Survey || — || align=right | 1.7 km || 
|-id=122 bgcolor=#E9E9E9
| 353122 ||  || — || March 28, 2009 || Catalina || CSS || — || align=right | 1.9 km || 
|-id=123 bgcolor=#E9E9E9
| 353123 ||  || — || March 28, 2009 || Kitt Peak || Spacewatch || AGN || align=right | 1.5 km || 
|-id=124 bgcolor=#E9E9E9
| 353124 ||  || — || March 28, 2009 || Kitt Peak || Spacewatch || 526 || align=right | 2.8 km || 
|-id=125 bgcolor=#E9E9E9
| 353125 ||  || — || March 28, 2009 || Mount Lemmon || Mount Lemmon Survey || — || align=right | 1.9 km || 
|-id=126 bgcolor=#E9E9E9
| 353126 ||  || — || February 19, 2009 || Kitt Peak || Spacewatch || AGN || align=right | 1.2 km || 
|-id=127 bgcolor=#E9E9E9
| 353127 ||  || — || March 21, 2009 || Mount Lemmon || Mount Lemmon Survey || — || align=right | 2.1 km || 
|-id=128 bgcolor=#d6d6d6
| 353128 ||  || — || March 22, 2009 || Mount Lemmon || Mount Lemmon Survey || CHA || align=right | 2.2 km || 
|-id=129 bgcolor=#E9E9E9
| 353129 ||  || — || March 28, 2009 || Catalina || CSS || — || align=right | 3.2 km || 
|-id=130 bgcolor=#E9E9E9
| 353130 ||  || — || March 29, 2009 || Catalina || CSS || GER || align=right | 2.0 km || 
|-id=131 bgcolor=#d6d6d6
| 353131 ||  || — || March 19, 2009 || Kitt Peak || Spacewatch || — || align=right | 3.2 km || 
|-id=132 bgcolor=#E9E9E9
| 353132 ||  || — || March 21, 2009 || Kitt Peak || Spacewatch || — || align=right | 2.9 km || 
|-id=133 bgcolor=#E9E9E9
| 353133 ||  || — || March 31, 2009 || Kitt Peak || Spacewatch || HOF || align=right | 2.7 km || 
|-id=134 bgcolor=#d6d6d6
| 353134 ||  || — || March 31, 2009 || Catalina || CSS || EOS || align=right | 2.5 km || 
|-id=135 bgcolor=#E9E9E9
| 353135 ||  || — || March 23, 2009 || Mount Lemmon || Mount Lemmon Survey || — || align=right | 1.6 km || 
|-id=136 bgcolor=#E9E9E9
| 353136 ||  || — || March 23, 2009 || Kitt Peak || Spacewatch || — || align=right data-sort-value="0.98" | 980 m || 
|-id=137 bgcolor=#E9E9E9
| 353137 ||  || — || April 12, 2009 || Altschwendt || W. Ries || — || align=right | 1.3 km || 
|-id=138 bgcolor=#E9E9E9
| 353138 ||  || — || April 15, 2009 || Siding Spring || SSS || MIT || align=right | 4.1 km || 
|-id=139 bgcolor=#d6d6d6
| 353139 ||  || — || April 17, 2009 || Kitt Peak || Spacewatch || — || align=right | 2.9 km || 
|-id=140 bgcolor=#E9E9E9
| 353140 ||  || — || April 17, 2009 || Kitt Peak || Spacewatch || AGN || align=right | 1.3 km || 
|-id=141 bgcolor=#d6d6d6
| 353141 ||  || — || April 17, 2009 || Kitt Peak || Spacewatch || — || align=right | 2.8 km || 
|-id=142 bgcolor=#E9E9E9
| 353142 ||  || — || April 17, 2009 || Kitt Peak || Spacewatch || — || align=right | 1.7 km || 
|-id=143 bgcolor=#d6d6d6
| 353143 ||  || — || April 19, 2009 || Kitt Peak || Spacewatch || — || align=right | 3.0 km || 
|-id=144 bgcolor=#E9E9E9
| 353144 ||  || — || April 16, 2009 || Catalina || CSS || — || align=right | 2.5 km || 
|-id=145 bgcolor=#E9E9E9
| 353145 ||  || — || April 18, 2009 || Kitt Peak || Spacewatch || — || align=right | 2.2 km || 
|-id=146 bgcolor=#d6d6d6
| 353146 ||  || — || April 18, 2009 || Kitt Peak || Spacewatch || K-2 || align=right | 1.4 km || 
|-id=147 bgcolor=#E9E9E9
| 353147 ||  || — || January 11, 2008 || Mount Lemmon || Mount Lemmon Survey || — || align=right | 2.3 km || 
|-id=148 bgcolor=#E9E9E9
| 353148 ||  || — || April 18, 2009 || Catalina || CSS || JUN || align=right | 1.1 km || 
|-id=149 bgcolor=#d6d6d6
| 353149 ||  || — || April 20, 2009 || Kitt Peak || Spacewatch || — || align=right | 3.4 km || 
|-id=150 bgcolor=#d6d6d6
| 353150 ||  || — || April 18, 2009 || Kitt Peak || Spacewatch || — || align=right | 3.0 km || 
|-id=151 bgcolor=#d6d6d6
| 353151 ||  || — || April 20, 2009 || Kitt Peak || Spacewatch || — || align=right | 3.3 km || 
|-id=152 bgcolor=#d6d6d6
| 353152 ||  || — || April 20, 2009 || Kitt Peak || Spacewatch || EOS || align=right | 2.4 km || 
|-id=153 bgcolor=#d6d6d6
| 353153 ||  || — || April 19, 2009 || Kitt Peak || Spacewatch || — || align=right | 3.8 km || 
|-id=154 bgcolor=#E9E9E9
| 353154 ||  || — || April 19, 2009 || Catalina || CSS || GEF || align=right | 1.5 km || 
|-id=155 bgcolor=#d6d6d6
| 353155 ||  || — || April 22, 2009 || Mount Lemmon || Mount Lemmon Survey || THM || align=right | 2.6 km || 
|-id=156 bgcolor=#d6d6d6
| 353156 ||  || — || April 22, 2009 || Kitt Peak || Spacewatch || — || align=right | 4.6 km || 
|-id=157 bgcolor=#d6d6d6
| 353157 ||  || — || April 23, 2009 || Kitt Peak || Spacewatch || — || align=right | 4.5 km || 
|-id=158 bgcolor=#d6d6d6
| 353158 ||  || — || April 23, 2009 || Kitt Peak || Spacewatch || — || align=right | 4.7 km || 
|-id=159 bgcolor=#d6d6d6
| 353159 ||  || — || October 2, 2006 || Mount Lemmon || Mount Lemmon Survey || EOS || align=right | 1.9 km || 
|-id=160 bgcolor=#d6d6d6
| 353160 ||  || — || April 19, 2009 || Catalina || CSS || — || align=right | 4.1 km || 
|-id=161 bgcolor=#d6d6d6
| 353161 ||  || — || April 27, 2009 || Purple Mountain || PMO NEO || — || align=right | 2.8 km || 
|-id=162 bgcolor=#d6d6d6
| 353162 ||  || — || April 29, 2009 || Kitt Peak || Spacewatch || URS || align=right | 5.3 km || 
|-id=163 bgcolor=#d6d6d6
| 353163 ||  || — || April 30, 2009 || Kitt Peak || Spacewatch || — || align=right | 3.5 km || 
|-id=164 bgcolor=#d6d6d6
| 353164 ||  || — || April 21, 2009 || Kitt Peak || Spacewatch || — || align=right | 2.8 km || 
|-id=165 bgcolor=#E9E9E9
| 353165 ||  || — || May 3, 2005 || Kitt Peak || Spacewatch || — || align=right | 1.7 km || 
|-id=166 bgcolor=#d6d6d6
| 353166 ||  || — || May 13, 2009 || Kitt Peak || Spacewatch || VER || align=right | 4.2 km || 
|-id=167 bgcolor=#d6d6d6
| 353167 ||  || — || May 2, 2009 || Mount Lemmon || Mount Lemmon Survey || EOS || align=right | 2.3 km || 
|-id=168 bgcolor=#d6d6d6
| 353168 ||  || — || May 17, 2009 || Kitt Peak || Spacewatch || — || align=right | 2.9 km || 
|-id=169 bgcolor=#d6d6d6
| 353169 ||  || — || May 24, 2009 || Catalina || CSS || EUP || align=right | 4.0 km || 
|-id=170 bgcolor=#d6d6d6
| 353170 ||  || — || November 11, 2006 || Kitt Peak || Spacewatch || — || align=right | 2.8 km || 
|-id=171 bgcolor=#d6d6d6
| 353171 ||  || — || June 11, 2009 || La Sagra || OAM Obs. || — || align=right | 3.3 km || 
|-id=172 bgcolor=#d6d6d6
| 353172 ||  || — || June 12, 2009 || Kitt Peak || Spacewatch || EOS || align=right | 2.4 km || 
|-id=173 bgcolor=#d6d6d6
| 353173 ||  || — || June 14, 2009 || Kitt Peak || Spacewatch || — || align=right | 3.1 km || 
|-id=174 bgcolor=#d6d6d6
| 353174 ||  || — || May 16, 2009 || Kitt Peak || Spacewatch || — || align=right | 4.5 km || 
|-id=175 bgcolor=#d6d6d6
| 353175 ||  || — || June 19, 2009 || Kitt Peak || Spacewatch || — || align=right | 4.0 km || 
|-id=176 bgcolor=#d6d6d6
| 353176 ||  || — || June 23, 2009 || Dauban || F. Kugel || THB || align=right | 3.3 km || 
|-id=177 bgcolor=#d6d6d6
| 353177 ||  || — || July 29, 2009 || La Sagra || OAM Obs. || THB || align=right | 4.2 km || 
|-id=178 bgcolor=#C2FFFF
| 353178 ||  || — || August 28, 2009 || Kitt Peak || Spacewatch || L4 || align=right | 8.0 km || 
|-id=179 bgcolor=#C2FFFF
| 353179 ||  || — || September 12, 2009 || Kitt Peak || Spacewatch || L4 || align=right | 9.1 km || 
|-id=180 bgcolor=#C2FFFF
| 353180 ||  || — || September 12, 2009 || Kitt Peak || Spacewatch || L4ERY || align=right | 8.5 km || 
|-id=181 bgcolor=#C2FFFF
| 353181 ||  || — || February 14, 2002 || Kitt Peak || Spacewatch || L4 || align=right | 9.0 km || 
|-id=182 bgcolor=#C2FFFF
| 353182 ||  || — || September 15, 2009 || Kitt Peak || Spacewatch || L4 || align=right | 9.5 km || 
|-id=183 bgcolor=#C2FFFF
| 353183 ||  || — || September 15, 2009 || Kitt Peak || Spacewatch || L4 || align=right | 7.9 km || 
|-id=184 bgcolor=#C2FFFF
| 353184 ||  || — || September 15, 2009 || Kitt Peak || Spacewatch || L4 || align=right | 8.0 km || 
|-id=185 bgcolor=#C2FFFF
| 353185 ||  || — || September 15, 2009 || Kitt Peak || Spacewatch || L4 || align=right | 10 km || 
|-id=186 bgcolor=#C2FFFF
| 353186 ||  || — || September 4, 2008 || Kitt Peak || Spacewatch || L4 || align=right | 7.5 km || 
|-id=187 bgcolor=#C2FFFF
| 353187 ||  || — || September 20, 2008 || Mount Lemmon || Mount Lemmon Survey || L4 || align=right | 7.2 km || 
|-id=188 bgcolor=#C2FFFF
| 353188 ||  || — || September 15, 2009 || Kitt Peak || Spacewatch || L4ERY || align=right | 9.0 km || 
|-id=189 bgcolor=#C2FFFF
| 353189 Iasus ||  ||  || September 13, 2009 || Palomar || PTF || L4 || align=right | 11 km || 
|-id=190 bgcolor=#FFC2E0
| 353190 ||  || — || September 16, 2009 || Mount Lemmon || Mount Lemmon Survey || AMOcritical || align=right data-sort-value="0.41" | 410 m || 
|-id=191 bgcolor=#C2FFFF
| 353191 ||  || — || September 16, 2009 || Kitt Peak || Spacewatch || L4 || align=right | 8.5 km || 
|-id=192 bgcolor=#C2FFFF
| 353192 ||  || — || September 17, 2009 || Kitt Peak || Spacewatch || L4 || align=right | 9.7 km || 
|-id=193 bgcolor=#C2FFFF
| 353193 ||  || — || February 13, 2002 || Apache Point || SDSS || L4ERY || align=right | 7.9 km || 
|-id=194 bgcolor=#C2FFFF
| 353194 ||  || — || September 17, 2009 || Moletai || K. Černis, J. Zdanavičius || L4 || align=right | 11 km || 
|-id=195 bgcolor=#C2FFFF
| 353195 ||  || — || February 13, 2002 || Apache Point || SDSS || L4 || align=right | 7.0 km || 
|-id=196 bgcolor=#C2FFFF
| 353196 ||  || — || September 4, 2008 || Kitt Peak || Spacewatch || L4 || align=right | 7.4 km || 
|-id=197 bgcolor=#C2FFFF
| 353197 ||  || — || September 21, 2009 || Kitt Peak || Spacewatch || L4 || align=right | 7.6 km || 
|-id=198 bgcolor=#C2FFFF
| 353198 ||  || — || September 7, 2008 || Mount Lemmon || Mount Lemmon Survey || L4 || align=right | 8.6 km || 
|-id=199 bgcolor=#C2FFFF
| 353199 ||  || — || September 23, 2009 || Mount Lemmon || Mount Lemmon Survey || L4 || align=right | 8.5 km || 
|-id=200 bgcolor=#C2FFFF
| 353200 ||  || — || September 17, 2009 || Kitt Peak || Spacewatch || L4 || align=right | 11 km || 
|}

353201–353300 

|-bgcolor=#C2FFFF
| 353201 ||  || — || September 17, 2009 || Kitt Peak || Spacewatch || L4 || align=right | 11 km || 
|-id=202 bgcolor=#C2FFFF
| 353202 ||  || — || September 26, 2009 || Kitt Peak || Spacewatch || L4 || align=right | 10 km || 
|-id=203 bgcolor=#C2FFFF
| 353203 ||  || — || September 23, 2009 || Mount Lemmon || Mount Lemmon Survey || L4 || align=right | 9.9 km || 
|-id=204 bgcolor=#C2FFFF
| 353204 ||  || — || September 25, 2009 || Kitt Peak || Spacewatch || L4 || align=right | 9.8 km || 
|-id=205 bgcolor=#C2FFFF
| 353205 ||  || — || September 20, 2009 || Kitt Peak || Spacewatch || L4 || align=right | 8.3 km || 
|-id=206 bgcolor=#fefefe
| 353206 ||  || — || September 20, 2009 || Catalina || CSS || H || align=right data-sort-value="0.80" | 800 m || 
|-id=207 bgcolor=#fefefe
| 353207 ||  || — || September 17, 2009 || Mount Lemmon || Mount Lemmon Survey || H || align=right data-sort-value="0.86" | 860 m || 
|-id=208 bgcolor=#C2FFFF
| 353208 ||  || — || September 17, 2009 || Kitt Peak || Spacewatch || L4 || align=right | 9.2 km || 
|-id=209 bgcolor=#C2FFFF
| 353209 ||  || — || September 28, 2009 || Mount Lemmon || Mount Lemmon Survey || L4ERY || align=right | 9.1 km || 
|-id=210 bgcolor=#C2FFFF
| 353210 ||  || — || September 18, 2009 || Catalina || CSS || L4 || align=right | 13 km || 
|-id=211 bgcolor=#C2FFFF
| 353211 ||  || — || September 20, 2009 || Kitt Peak || Spacewatch || L4 || align=right | 9.3 km || 
|-id=212 bgcolor=#C2FFFF
| 353212 ||  || — || April 24, 2003 || Kitt Peak || Spacewatch || L4 || align=right | 8.7 km || 
|-id=213 bgcolor=#C2FFFF
| 353213 ||  || — || September 18, 2009 || Kitt Peak || Spacewatch || L4 || align=right | 7.3 km || 
|-id=214 bgcolor=#fefefe
| 353214 ||  || — || October 12, 2009 || Socorro || LINEAR || H || align=right | 1.0 km || 
|-id=215 bgcolor=#C2FFFF
| 353215 ||  || — || October 14, 2009 || Catalina || CSS || L4 || align=right | 15 km || 
|-id=216 bgcolor=#d6d6d6
| 353216 ||  || — || October 17, 2009 || Catalina || CSS || — || align=right | 5.7 km || 
|-id=217 bgcolor=#C2FFFF
| 353217 ||  || — || September 28, 2009 || Kitt Peak || Spacewatch || L4 || align=right | 8.1 km || 
|-id=218 bgcolor=#C2FFFF
| 353218 ||  || — || October 17, 2009 || Mount Lemmon || Mount Lemmon Survey || L4 || align=right | 16 km || 
|-id=219 bgcolor=#fefefe
| 353219 ||  || — || October 27, 2009 || Catalina || CSS || H || align=right | 1.0 km || 
|-id=220 bgcolor=#fefefe
| 353220 ||  || — || November 21, 2009 || Mount Lemmon || Mount Lemmon Survey || — || align=right data-sort-value="0.86" | 860 m || 
|-id=221 bgcolor=#fefefe
| 353221 ||  || — || November 16, 1998 || Kitt Peak || Spacewatch || H || align=right data-sort-value="0.74" | 740 m || 
|-id=222 bgcolor=#C2E0FF
| 353222 ||  || — || December 16, 2009 || La Silla || D. L. Rabinowitz || centaur || align=right | 45 km || 
|-id=223 bgcolor=#E9E9E9
| 353223 ||  || — || September 3, 2004 || Siding Spring || SSS || EUN || align=right | 2.2 km || 
|-id=224 bgcolor=#fefefe
| 353224 ||  || — || January 5, 2010 || Kitt Peak || Spacewatch || — || align=right data-sort-value="0.81" | 810 m || 
|-id=225 bgcolor=#fefefe
| 353225 ||  || — || January 6, 2010 || Kitt Peak || Spacewatch || FLO || align=right data-sort-value="0.78" | 780 m || 
|-id=226 bgcolor=#E9E9E9
| 353226 ||  || — || July 18, 2007 || Mount Lemmon || Mount Lemmon Survey || — || align=right | 3.4 km || 
|-id=227 bgcolor=#C2FFFF
| 353227 ||  || — || October 1, 2009 || Mount Lemmon || Mount Lemmon Survey || L4 || align=right | 13 km || 
|-id=228 bgcolor=#C2FFFF
| 353228 ||  || — || September 17, 2009 || Mount Lemmon || Mount Lemmon Survey || L4 || align=right | 13 km || 
|-id=229 bgcolor=#fefefe
| 353229 ||  || — || January 14, 2010 || WISE || WISE || PHO || align=right | 2.7 km || 
|-id=230 bgcolor=#C2FFFF
| 353230 ||  || — || September 3, 2008 || Kitt Peak || Spacewatch || L4 || align=right | 8.9 km || 
|-id=231 bgcolor=#E9E9E9
| 353231 ||  || — || January 22, 2010 || WISE || WISE || BRU || align=right | 3.2 km || 
|-id=232 bgcolor=#fefefe
| 353232 Nolwenn ||  ||  || February 6, 2010 || Mayhill || S. Kürti || KLI || align=right | 2.9 km || 
|-id=233 bgcolor=#fefefe
| 353233 ||  || — || February 13, 2010 || Kitt Peak || Spacewatch || — || align=right data-sort-value="0.77" | 770 m || 
|-id=234 bgcolor=#fefefe
| 353234 ||  || — || January 5, 2003 || Kitt Peak || Spacewatch || FLO || align=right data-sort-value="0.74" | 740 m || 
|-id=235 bgcolor=#d6d6d6
| 353235 ||  || — || February 12, 2010 || WISE || WISE || TIR || align=right | 4.3 km || 
|-id=236 bgcolor=#fefefe
| 353236 ||  || — || February 9, 2010 || Kitt Peak || Spacewatch || — || align=right data-sort-value="0.69" | 690 m || 
|-id=237 bgcolor=#fefefe
| 353237 ||  || — || February 14, 2010 || Kitt Peak || Spacewatch || — || align=right data-sort-value="0.71" | 710 m || 
|-id=238 bgcolor=#fefefe
| 353238 ||  || — || February 14, 2010 || Kitt Peak || Spacewatch || — || align=right data-sort-value="0.53" | 530 m || 
|-id=239 bgcolor=#fefefe
| 353239 ||  || — || February 14, 2010 || Kitt Peak || Spacewatch || — || align=right data-sort-value="0.91" | 910 m || 
|-id=240 bgcolor=#fefefe
| 353240 ||  || — || February 14, 2010 || Kitt Peak || Spacewatch || — || align=right | 1.0 km || 
|-id=241 bgcolor=#fefefe
| 353241 ||  || — || February 14, 2010 || Kitt Peak || Spacewatch || NYS || align=right data-sort-value="0.70" | 700 m || 
|-id=242 bgcolor=#fefefe
| 353242 ||  || — || February 15, 2010 || Catalina || CSS || — || align=right data-sort-value="0.94" | 940 m || 
|-id=243 bgcolor=#E9E9E9
| 353243 ||  || — || February 15, 2010 || Catalina || CSS || — || align=right | 1.7 km || 
|-id=244 bgcolor=#fefefe
| 353244 ||  || — || February 15, 2010 || Mount Lemmon || Mount Lemmon Survey || — || align=right data-sort-value="0.85" | 850 m || 
|-id=245 bgcolor=#fefefe
| 353245 ||  || — || February 13, 2010 || Kitt Peak || Spacewatch || — || align=right data-sort-value="0.94" | 940 m || 
|-id=246 bgcolor=#E9E9E9
| 353246 ||  || — || February 20, 2010 || WISE || WISE || — || align=right | 2.3 km || 
|-id=247 bgcolor=#E9E9E9
| 353247 ||  || — || February 23, 2010 || WISE || WISE || — || align=right | 2.4 km || 
|-id=248 bgcolor=#E9E9E9
| 353248 ||  || — || March 12, 2010 || Mount Lemmon || Mount Lemmon Survey || — || align=right | 2.6 km || 
|-id=249 bgcolor=#fefefe
| 353249 ||  || — || January 12, 2010 || Kitt Peak || Spacewatch || — || align=right | 1.3 km || 
|-id=250 bgcolor=#fefefe
| 353250 ||  || — || March 12, 2010 || Mount Lemmon || Mount Lemmon Survey || LCI || align=right | 2.0 km || 
|-id=251 bgcolor=#fefefe
| 353251 ||  || — || March 12, 2010 || Mount Lemmon || Mount Lemmon Survey || — || align=right | 1.3 km || 
|-id=252 bgcolor=#fefefe
| 353252 ||  || — || March 11, 2010 || La Sagra || OAM Obs. || — || align=right | 1.5 km || 
|-id=253 bgcolor=#E9E9E9
| 353253 ||  || — || March 4, 2010 || Catalina || CSS || — || align=right | 2.7 km || 
|-id=254 bgcolor=#fefefe
| 353254 ||  || — || January 31, 2006 || Kitt Peak || Spacewatch || NYS || align=right data-sort-value="0.69" | 690 m || 
|-id=255 bgcolor=#fefefe
| 353255 ||  || — || March 13, 2010 || Catalina || CSS || V || align=right data-sort-value="0.88" | 880 m || 
|-id=256 bgcolor=#E9E9E9
| 353256 ||  || — || January 8, 2010 || Mount Lemmon || Mount Lemmon Survey || WIT || align=right | 1.4 km || 
|-id=257 bgcolor=#fefefe
| 353257 ||  || — || March 12, 2010 || Mount Lemmon || Mount Lemmon Survey || FLO || align=right data-sort-value="0.70" | 700 m || 
|-id=258 bgcolor=#fefefe
| 353258 ||  || — || October 20, 2008 || Mount Lemmon || Mount Lemmon Survey || NYS || align=right data-sort-value="0.96" | 960 m || 
|-id=259 bgcolor=#fefefe
| 353259 ||  || — || March 13, 2010 || Kitt Peak || Spacewatch || — || align=right data-sort-value="0.82" | 820 m || 
|-id=260 bgcolor=#fefefe
| 353260 ||  || — || March 12, 2010 || Mount Lemmon || Mount Lemmon Survey || FLO || align=right data-sort-value="0.77" | 770 m || 
|-id=261 bgcolor=#fefefe
| 353261 ||  || — || March 12, 2010 || Kitt Peak || Spacewatch || ERI || align=right | 2.4 km || 
|-id=262 bgcolor=#fefefe
| 353262 ||  || — || March 12, 2010 || Kitt Peak || Spacewatch || — || align=right data-sort-value="0.90" | 900 m || 
|-id=263 bgcolor=#fefefe
| 353263 ||  || — || March 14, 2010 || Kitt Peak || Spacewatch || — || align=right | 1.6 km || 
|-id=264 bgcolor=#fefefe
| 353264 ||  || — || March 15, 2010 || Kitt Peak || Spacewatch || — || align=right data-sort-value="0.64" | 640 m || 
|-id=265 bgcolor=#fefefe
| 353265 ||  || — || March 12, 2010 || Kitt Peak || Spacewatch || — || align=right | 1.4 km || 
|-id=266 bgcolor=#fefefe
| 353266 ||  || — || March 13, 2010 || Kitt Peak || Spacewatch || — || align=right data-sort-value="0.75" | 750 m || 
|-id=267 bgcolor=#fefefe
| 353267 ||  || — || March 13, 2010 || Kitt Peak || Spacewatch || — || align=right data-sort-value="0.85" | 850 m || 
|-id=268 bgcolor=#fefefe
| 353268 ||  || — || March 13, 2010 || Catalina || CSS || FLO || align=right | 1.3 km || 
|-id=269 bgcolor=#fefefe
| 353269 ||  || — || March 15, 2010 || Catalina || CSS || — || align=right | 1.1 km || 
|-id=270 bgcolor=#fefefe
| 353270 ||  || — || March 12, 2010 || Kitt Peak || Spacewatch || V || align=right data-sort-value="0.55" | 550 m || 
|-id=271 bgcolor=#fefefe
| 353271 ||  || — || March 13, 2010 || Kitt Peak || Spacewatch || NYS || align=right data-sort-value="0.74" | 740 m || 
|-id=272 bgcolor=#fefefe
| 353272 ||  || — || March 8, 2000 || Kitt Peak || Spacewatch || FLO || align=right data-sort-value="0.59" | 590 m || 
|-id=273 bgcolor=#fefefe
| 353273 ||  || — || March 18, 2010 || Kitt Peak || Spacewatch || — || align=right | 1.2 km || 
|-id=274 bgcolor=#fefefe
| 353274 ||  || — || March 20, 2010 || Catalina || CSS || — || align=right data-sort-value="0.95" | 950 m || 
|-id=275 bgcolor=#fefefe
| 353275 ||  || — || March 25, 2010 || Mount Lemmon || Mount Lemmon Survey || NYS || align=right data-sort-value="0.63" | 630 m || 
|-id=276 bgcolor=#fefefe
| 353276 ||  || — || March 19, 2010 || Mount Lemmon || Mount Lemmon Survey || FLO || align=right | 1.7 km || 
|-id=277 bgcolor=#fefefe
| 353277 ||  || — || March 15, 2010 || Mount Lemmon || Mount Lemmon Survey || NYS || align=right data-sort-value="0.59" | 590 m || 
|-id=278 bgcolor=#fefefe
| 353278 ||  || — || March 26, 2010 || Kitt Peak || Spacewatch || — || align=right data-sort-value="0.93" | 930 m || 
|-id=279 bgcolor=#fefefe
| 353279 ||  || — || January 26, 2006 || Mount Lemmon || Mount Lemmon Survey || — || align=right data-sort-value="0.73" | 730 m || 
|-id=280 bgcolor=#fefefe
| 353280 ||  || — || March 21, 2010 || Kitt Peak || Spacewatch || MAS || align=right data-sort-value="0.77" | 770 m || 
|-id=281 bgcolor=#fefefe
| 353281 ||  || — || March 25, 2010 || Kitt Peak || Spacewatch || — || align=right data-sort-value="0.96" | 960 m || 
|-id=282 bgcolor=#fefefe
| 353282 ||  || — || April 6, 2010 || Mount Lemmon || Mount Lemmon Survey || — || align=right data-sort-value="0.77" | 770 m || 
|-id=283 bgcolor=#fefefe
| 353283 ||  || — || October 28, 2008 || Kitt Peak || Spacewatch || — || align=right data-sort-value="0.80" | 800 m || 
|-id=284 bgcolor=#fefefe
| 353284 ||  || — || January 9, 2010 || WISE || WISE || — || align=right | 2.1 km || 
|-id=285 bgcolor=#fefefe
| 353285 ||  || — || October 29, 2008 || Kitt Peak || Spacewatch || — || align=right data-sort-value="0.94" | 940 m || 
|-id=286 bgcolor=#fefefe
| 353286 ||  || — || April 8, 2010 || Črni Vrh || Črni Vrh || ERI || align=right | 2.1 km || 
|-id=287 bgcolor=#d6d6d6
| 353287 ||  || — || January 8, 2002 || Haleakala || NEAT || — || align=right | 5.3 km || 
|-id=288 bgcolor=#E9E9E9
| 353288 ||  || — || April 7, 2010 || Kitt Peak || Spacewatch || — || align=right | 3.0 km || 
|-id=289 bgcolor=#fefefe
| 353289 ||  || — || April 8, 2010 || Kitt Peak || Spacewatch || NYS || align=right data-sort-value="0.78" | 780 m || 
|-id=290 bgcolor=#E9E9E9
| 353290 ||  || — || April 3, 2010 || Kitt Peak || Spacewatch || — || align=right | 1.7 km || 
|-id=291 bgcolor=#fefefe
| 353291 ||  || — || April 8, 2010 || Kitt Peak || Spacewatch || — || align=right data-sort-value="0.91" | 910 m || 
|-id=292 bgcolor=#fefefe
| 353292 ||  || — || April 9, 2010 || Mount Lemmon || Mount Lemmon Survey || FLO || align=right data-sort-value="0.61" | 610 m || 
|-id=293 bgcolor=#fefefe
| 353293 ||  || — || April 8, 2010 || Catalina || CSS || — || align=right | 1.1 km || 
|-id=294 bgcolor=#d6d6d6
| 353294 ||  || — || April 15, 2010 || WISE || WISE || LIX || align=right | 3.6 km || 
|-id=295 bgcolor=#E9E9E9
| 353295 ||  || — || April 15, 2010 || WISE || WISE || — || align=right | 3.3 km || 
|-id=296 bgcolor=#fefefe
| 353296 ||  || — || April 9, 2010 || Kitt Peak || Spacewatch || NYS || align=right data-sort-value="0.78" | 780 m || 
|-id=297 bgcolor=#fefefe
| 353297 ||  || — || October 28, 2008 || Catalina || CSS || — || align=right | 1.1 km || 
|-id=298 bgcolor=#d6d6d6
| 353298 ||  || — || April 23, 2010 || WISE || WISE || — || align=right | 3.3 km || 
|-id=299 bgcolor=#fefefe
| 353299 ||  || — || April 17, 2010 || Mount Lemmon || Mount Lemmon Survey || FLO || align=right data-sort-value="0.53" | 530 m || 
|-id=300 bgcolor=#fefefe
| 353300 ||  || — || April 20, 2010 || Kitt Peak || Spacewatch || NYS || align=right | 2.2 km || 
|}

353301–353400 

|-bgcolor=#fefefe
| 353301 ||  || — || February 21, 2006 || Mount Lemmon || Mount Lemmon Survey || V || align=right data-sort-value="0.62" | 620 m || 
|-id=302 bgcolor=#E9E9E9
| 353302 ||  || — || April 26, 2010 || Mount Lemmon || Mount Lemmon Survey || EUN || align=right | 1.6 km || 
|-id=303 bgcolor=#fefefe
| 353303 ||  || — || May 3, 2010 || Kitt Peak || Spacewatch || NYS || align=right data-sort-value="0.77" | 770 m || 
|-id=304 bgcolor=#fefefe
| 353304 ||  || — || May 6, 2010 || Mount Lemmon || Mount Lemmon Survey || — || align=right | 1.2 km || 
|-id=305 bgcolor=#E9E9E9
| 353305 ||  || — || May 6, 2010 || Mount Lemmon || Mount Lemmon Survey || ADE || align=right | 3.3 km || 
|-id=306 bgcolor=#d6d6d6
| 353306 ||  || — || May 7, 2010 || WISE || WISE || — || align=right | 4.7 km || 
|-id=307 bgcolor=#E9E9E9
| 353307 ||  || — || May 7, 2010 || Mount Lemmon || Mount Lemmon Survey || INO || align=right | 1.5 km || 
|-id=308 bgcolor=#fefefe
| 353308 ||  || — || May 11, 2010 || Mount Lemmon || Mount Lemmon Survey || — || align=right | 1.1 km || 
|-id=309 bgcolor=#E9E9E9
| 353309 ||  || — || November 8, 2007 || Mount Lemmon || Mount Lemmon Survey || — || align=right | 2.9 km || 
|-id=310 bgcolor=#E9E9E9
| 353310 ||  || — || April 8, 2010 || Catalina || CSS || — || align=right | 1.4 km || 
|-id=311 bgcolor=#d6d6d6
| 353311 ||  || — || December 21, 2006 || Kitt Peak || Spacewatch || EOS || align=right | 4.8 km || 
|-id=312 bgcolor=#d6d6d6
| 353312 ||  || — || May 13, 2010 || WISE || WISE || — || align=right | 4.1 km || 
|-id=313 bgcolor=#E9E9E9
| 353313 ||  || — || May 7, 2010 || Mount Lemmon || Mount Lemmon Survey || — || align=right | 1.9 km || 
|-id=314 bgcolor=#d6d6d6
| 353314 ||  || — || October 21, 2006 || Mount Lemmon || Mount Lemmon Survey || — || align=right | 3.9 km || 
|-id=315 bgcolor=#fefefe
| 353315 ||  || — || February 27, 2006 || Kitt Peak || Spacewatch || MAS || align=right data-sort-value="0.75" | 750 m || 
|-id=316 bgcolor=#d6d6d6
| 353316 ||  || — || May 17, 2010 || WISE || WISE || — || align=right | 3.4 km || 
|-id=317 bgcolor=#fefefe
| 353317 ||  || — || May 20, 2010 || Mount Lemmon || Mount Lemmon Survey || NYS || align=right data-sort-value="0.68" | 680 m || 
|-id=318 bgcolor=#d6d6d6
| 353318 ||  || — || May 22, 2010 || WISE || WISE || — || align=right | 4.4 km || 
|-id=319 bgcolor=#d6d6d6
| 353319 ||  || — || May 27, 2010 || WISE || WISE || URS || align=right | 3.3 km || 
|-id=320 bgcolor=#d6d6d6
| 353320 ||  || — || March 2, 2010 || WISE || WISE || EUP || align=right | 4.7 km || 
|-id=321 bgcolor=#fefefe
| 353321 ||  || — || May 28, 2000 || Socorro || LINEAR || — || align=right data-sort-value="0.80" | 800 m || 
|-id=322 bgcolor=#d6d6d6
| 353322 ||  || — || June 2, 2010 || WISE || WISE || TIR || align=right | 5.4 km || 
|-id=323 bgcolor=#fefefe
| 353323 ||  || — || June 6, 2010 || WISE || WISE || PHO || align=right | 1.3 km || 
|-id=324 bgcolor=#E9E9E9
| 353324 ||  || — || March 9, 2005 || Catalina || CSS || HNS || align=right | 1.6 km || 
|-id=325 bgcolor=#E9E9E9
| 353325 ||  || — || June 6, 2010 || Kitt Peak || Spacewatch || — || align=right | 2.5 km || 
|-id=326 bgcolor=#d6d6d6
| 353326 ||  || — || March 23, 2003 || Kitt Peak || Spacewatch || — || align=right | 4.3 km || 
|-id=327 bgcolor=#E9E9E9
| 353327 ||  || — || June 15, 2010 || Socorro || LINEAR || — || align=right | 1.5 km || 
|-id=328 bgcolor=#d6d6d6
| 353328 ||  || — || June 19, 2010 || WISE || WISE || — || align=right | 4.3 km || 
|-id=329 bgcolor=#d6d6d6
| 353329 ||  || — || June 22, 2010 || WISE || WISE || — || align=right | 4.6 km || 
|-id=330 bgcolor=#E9E9E9
| 353330 ||  || — || July 5, 2010 || Mount Lemmon || Mount Lemmon Survey || ADE || align=right | 2.7 km || 
|-id=331 bgcolor=#d6d6d6
| 353331 ||  || — || February 28, 2008 || Mount Lemmon || Mount Lemmon Survey || — || align=right | 3.8 km || 
|-id=332 bgcolor=#E9E9E9
| 353332 ||  || — || November 19, 2007 || Mount Lemmon || Mount Lemmon Survey || — || align=right | 3.5 km || 
|-id=333 bgcolor=#E9E9E9
| 353333 ||  || — || July 25, 2010 || WISE || WISE || — || align=right | 3.4 km || 
|-id=334 bgcolor=#E9E9E9
| 353334 ||  || — || January 18, 2005 || Catalina || CSS || KON || align=right | 3.7 km || 
|-id=335 bgcolor=#E9E9E9
| 353335 ||  || — || August 2, 2010 || WISE || WISE || — || align=right | 1.6 km || 
|-id=336 bgcolor=#C2FFFF
| 353336 ||  || — || August 10, 2010 || Kitt Peak || Spacewatch || L4 || align=right | 7.7 km || 
|-id=337 bgcolor=#d6d6d6
| 353337 ||  || — || December 17, 2003 || Kitt Peak || Spacewatch || 3:2 || align=right | 5.9 km || 
|-id=338 bgcolor=#d6d6d6
| 353338 ||  || — || December 31, 2007 || Mount Lemmon || Mount Lemmon Survey || — || align=right | 3.4 km || 
|-id=339 bgcolor=#E9E9E9
| 353339 ||  || — || August 18, 2001 || Palomar || NEAT || — || align=right | 2.4 km || 
|-id=340 bgcolor=#d6d6d6
| 353340 ||  || — || January 8, 2002 || Kitt Peak || Spacewatch || — || align=right | 4.3 km || 
|-id=341 bgcolor=#d6d6d6
| 353341 ||  || — || February 10, 2007 || Mount Lemmon || Mount Lemmon Survey || — || align=right | 3.9 km || 
|-id=342 bgcolor=#C2FFFF
| 353342 ||  || — || October 13, 2010 || Mount Lemmon || Mount Lemmon Survey || L4 || align=right | 11 km || 
|-id=343 bgcolor=#C2FFFF
| 353343 ||  || — || October 2, 2010 || Mount Lemmon || Mount Lemmon Survey || L4 || align=right | 10 km || 
|-id=344 bgcolor=#C2FFFF
| 353344 ||  || — || March 9, 2002 || Kitt Peak || Spacewatch || L4 || align=right | 7.4 km || 
|-id=345 bgcolor=#fefefe
| 353345 ||  || — || November 15, 1995 || Kitt Peak || Spacewatch || V || align=right data-sort-value="0.63" | 630 m || 
|-id=346 bgcolor=#C2FFFF
| 353346 ||  || — || September 28, 2009 || Mount Lemmon || Mount Lemmon Survey || L4ERY || align=right | 7.8 km || 
|-id=347 bgcolor=#C2FFFF
| 353347 ||  || — || September 19, 2009 || Kitt Peak || Spacewatch || L4 || align=right | 9.2 km || 
|-id=348 bgcolor=#C2FFFF
| 353348 ||  || — || February 2, 2001 || Kitt Peak || Spacewatch || L4 || align=right | 6.9 km || 
|-id=349 bgcolor=#C2FFFF
| 353349 ||  || — || September 9, 2007 || Mauna Kea || D. D. Balam || L4 || align=right | 8.8 km || 
|-id=350 bgcolor=#C2FFFF
| 353350 ||  || — || December 28, 2000 || Kitt Peak || Spacewatch || L4ERY || align=right | 9.2 km || 
|-id=351 bgcolor=#C2FFFF
| 353351 ||  || — || September 27, 2009 || Mount Lemmon || Mount Lemmon Survey || L4ERY || align=right | 9.8 km || 
|-id=352 bgcolor=#C2FFFF
| 353352 ||  || — || September 25, 2009 || Kitt Peak || Spacewatch || L4 || align=right | 7.9 km || 
|-id=353 bgcolor=#C2FFFF
| 353353 ||  || — || March 23, 2003 || Kitt Peak || Spacewatch || L4 || align=right | 9.5 km || 
|-id=354 bgcolor=#C2FFFF
| 353354 ||  || — || September 6, 2008 || Mount Lemmon || Mount Lemmon Survey || L4 || align=right | 8.8 km || 
|-id=355 bgcolor=#C2FFFF
| 353355 ||  || — || September 7, 2008 || Mount Lemmon || Mount Lemmon Survey || L4 || align=right | 7.4 km || 
|-id=356 bgcolor=#C2FFFF
| 353356 ||  || — || September 18, 2009 || Kitt Peak || Spacewatch || L4ERY || align=right | 7.4 km || 
|-id=357 bgcolor=#C2FFFF
| 353357 ||  || — || November 15, 1998 || Kitt Peak || Spacewatch || L4 || align=right | 7.1 km || 
|-id=358 bgcolor=#C2FFFF
| 353358 ||  || — || September 28, 2008 || Mount Lemmon || Mount Lemmon Survey || L4 || align=right | 8.6 km || 
|-id=359 bgcolor=#C2FFFF
| 353359 ||  || — || April 21, 2003 || Kitt Peak || Spacewatch || L4ARK || align=right | 12 km || 
|-id=360 bgcolor=#C2FFFF
| 353360 ||  || — || August 24, 2008 || Kitt Peak || Spacewatch || L4 || align=right | 8.8 km || 
|-id=361 bgcolor=#C2FFFF
| 353361 ||  || — || June 8, 2005 || Kitt Peak || Spacewatch || L4 || align=right | 12 km || 
|-id=362 bgcolor=#C2FFFF
| 353362 ||  || — || October 8, 2010 || Catalina || CSS || L4 || align=right | 9.7 km || 
|-id=363 bgcolor=#C2FFFF
| 353363 ||  || — || March 31, 2003 || Anderson Mesa || LONEOS || L4 || align=right | 15 km || 
|-id=364 bgcolor=#C2FFFF
| 353364 ||  || — || November 17, 2009 || Catalina || CSS || L4 || align=right | 14 km || 
|-id=365 bgcolor=#E9E9E9
| 353365 ||  || — || September 27, 2008 || Mount Lemmon || Mount Lemmon Survey || — || align=right | 2.5 km || 
|-id=366 bgcolor=#fefefe
| 353366 ||  || — || September 13, 2005 || Catalina || CSS || — || align=right data-sort-value="0.98" | 980 m || 
|-id=367 bgcolor=#fefefe
| 353367 ||  || — || April 30, 2006 || Catalina || CSS || H || align=right data-sort-value="0.92" | 920 m || 
|-id=368 bgcolor=#fefefe
| 353368 ||  || — || April 5, 2003 || Kitt Peak || Spacewatch || H || align=right data-sort-value="0.72" | 720 m || 
|-id=369 bgcolor=#fefefe
| 353369 ||  || — || September 18, 2009 || Catalina || CSS || H || align=right data-sort-value="0.79" | 790 m || 
|-id=370 bgcolor=#E9E9E9
| 353370 ||  || — || June 25, 2003 || Socorro || LINEAR || — || align=right | 2.0 km || 
|-id=371 bgcolor=#fefefe
| 353371 ||  || — || May 28, 2003 || Catalina || CSS || H || align=right data-sort-value="0.94" | 940 m || 
|-id=372 bgcolor=#fefefe
| 353372 ||  || — || July 14, 2001 || Palomar || NEAT || — || align=right data-sort-value="0.81" | 810 m || 
|-id=373 bgcolor=#E9E9E9
| 353373 ||  || — || June 23, 2003 || Socorro || LINEAR || — || align=right | 2.0 km || 
|-id=374 bgcolor=#fefefe
| 353374 ||  || — || July 30, 2006 || Siding Spring || SSS || H || align=right data-sort-value="0.93" | 930 m || 
|-id=375 bgcolor=#fefefe
| 353375 ||  || — || October 7, 1977 || Palomar || PLS || — || align=right | 1.1 km || 
|-id=376 bgcolor=#fefefe
| 353376 ||  || — || July 6, 2003 || Kitt Peak || Spacewatch || H || align=right | 1.1 km || 
|-id=377 bgcolor=#d6d6d6
| 353377 ||  || — || June 20, 2006 || Mount Lemmon || Mount Lemmon Survey || — || align=right | 2.8 km || 
|-id=378 bgcolor=#d6d6d6
| 353378 ||  || — || June 13, 2010 || Nogales || Tenagra II Obs. || — || align=right | 4.0 km || 
|-id=379 bgcolor=#E9E9E9
| 353379 ||  || — || October 1, 2002 || Haleakala || NEAT || — || align=right | 2.0 km || 
|-id=380 bgcolor=#fefefe
| 353380 ||  || — || December 12, 2004 || Socorro || LINEAR || H || align=right data-sort-value="0.88" | 880 m || 
|-id=381 bgcolor=#fefefe
| 353381 ||  || — || December 1, 2005 || Kitt Peak || Spacewatch || FLO || align=right data-sort-value="0.66" | 660 m || 
|-id=382 bgcolor=#E9E9E9
| 353382 ||  || — || July 17, 2002 || Palomar || NEAT || GAL || align=right | 2.1 km || 
|-id=383 bgcolor=#E9E9E9
| 353383 ||  || — || September 3, 1994 || La Silla || E. W. Elst || MIS || align=right | 2.4 km || 
|-id=384 bgcolor=#E9E9E9
| 353384 ||  || — || December 3, 2002 || Palomar || NEAT || — || align=right | 2.5 km || 
|-id=385 bgcolor=#fefefe
| 353385 ||  || — || December 29, 2008 || Mount Lemmon || Mount Lemmon Survey || NYS || align=right data-sort-value="0.81" | 810 m || 
|-id=386 bgcolor=#fefefe
| 353386 ||  || — || March 24, 2003 || Kitt Peak || Spacewatch || — || align=right data-sort-value="0.97" | 970 m || 
|-id=387 bgcolor=#d6d6d6
| 353387 ||  || — || March 31, 2009 || Kitt Peak || Spacewatch || — || align=right | 3.6 km || 
|-id=388 bgcolor=#E9E9E9
| 353388 ||  || — || September 13, 2007 || Catalina || CSS || AER || align=right | 1.9 km || 
|-id=389 bgcolor=#fefefe
| 353389 ||  || — || January 27, 2006 || Kitt Peak || Spacewatch || V || align=right data-sort-value="0.68" | 680 m || 
|-id=390 bgcolor=#fefefe
| 353390 ||  || — || September 29, 2008 || Mount Lemmon || Mount Lemmon Survey || V || align=right data-sort-value="0.74" | 740 m || 
|-id=391 bgcolor=#fefefe
| 353391 ||  || — || September 23, 2000 || Socorro || LINEAR || V || align=right data-sort-value="0.80" | 800 m || 
|-id=392 bgcolor=#fefefe
| 353392 ||  || — || May 17, 1999 || Anderson Mesa || LONEOS || — || align=right | 1.6 km || 
|-id=393 bgcolor=#E9E9E9
| 353393 ||  || — || October 21, 2007 || Catalina || CSS || — || align=right | 1.7 km || 
|-id=394 bgcolor=#fefefe
| 353394 ||  || — || September 24, 2008 || Kitt Peak || Spacewatch || FLO || align=right data-sort-value="0.63" | 630 m || 
|-id=395 bgcolor=#fefefe
| 353395 ||  || — || August 6, 2004 || Campo Imperatore || CINEOS || V || align=right data-sort-value="0.61" | 610 m || 
|-id=396 bgcolor=#fefefe
| 353396 ||  || — || September 27, 2000 || Kitt Peak || Spacewatch || MAS || align=right data-sort-value="0.94" | 940 m || 
|-id=397 bgcolor=#fefefe
| 353397 ||  || — || June 21, 2007 || Anderson Mesa || LONEOS || — || align=right | 1.4 km || 
|-id=398 bgcolor=#fefefe
| 353398 ||  || — || January 16, 2005 || Kitt Peak || Spacewatch || H || align=right data-sort-value="0.73" | 730 m || 
|-id=399 bgcolor=#fefefe
| 353399 ||  || — || September 21, 2000 || Anderson Mesa || LONEOS || — || align=right | 1.2 km || 
|-id=400 bgcolor=#fefefe
| 353400 ||  || — || September 26, 2008 || Kitt Peak || Spacewatch || FLO || align=right data-sort-value="0.59" | 590 m || 
|}

353401–353500 

|-bgcolor=#E9E9E9
| 353401 ||  || — || December 16, 2007 || Catalina || CSS || — || align=right | 2.5 km || 
|-id=402 bgcolor=#d6d6d6
| 353402 ||  || — || October 7, 1996 || Kitt Peak || Spacewatch || EOS || align=right | 2.0 km || 
|-id=403 bgcolor=#E9E9E9
| 353403 ||  || — || December 29, 2008 || Mount Lemmon || Mount Lemmon Survey || — || align=right | 1.1 km || 
|-id=404 bgcolor=#d6d6d6
| 353404 Laugalys ||  ||  || September 25, 2006 || Moletai || K. Černis, J. Zdanavičius || — || align=right | 3.6 km || 
|-id=405 bgcolor=#fefefe
| 353405 ||  || — || August 23, 2003 || Palomar || NEAT || — || align=right | 1.3 km || 
|-id=406 bgcolor=#d6d6d6
| 353406 ||  || — || February 2, 2009 || Catalina || CSS || — || align=right | 5.0 km || 
|-id=407 bgcolor=#E9E9E9
| 353407 ||  || — || February 4, 2005 || Kitt Peak || Spacewatch || — || align=right | 1.1 km || 
|-id=408 bgcolor=#E9E9E9
| 353408 ||  || — || October 5, 2002 || Palomar || NEAT || MRX || align=right data-sort-value="0.91" | 910 m || 
|-id=409 bgcolor=#E9E9E9
| 353409 ||  || — || August 19, 2011 || Haleakala || Pan-STARRS || — || align=right | 2.2 km || 
|-id=410 bgcolor=#fefefe
| 353410 ||  || — || July 3, 2003 || Kitt Peak || Spacewatch || — || align=right | 1.2 km || 
|-id=411 bgcolor=#E9E9E9
| 353411 ||  || — || October 10, 2007 || Lulin Observatory || Lulin Obs. || — || align=right | 1.6 km || 
|-id=412 bgcolor=#d6d6d6
| 353412 ||  || — || September 17, 2006 || Catalina || CSS || — || align=right | 4.4 km || 
|-id=413 bgcolor=#fefefe
| 353413 ||  || — || July 11, 2004 || Socorro || LINEAR || FLO || align=right data-sort-value="0.72" | 720 m || 
|-id=414 bgcolor=#E9E9E9
| 353414 ||  || — || August 23, 2003 || Palomar || NEAT || — || align=right | 1.3 km || 
|-id=415 bgcolor=#fefefe
| 353415 ||  || — || December 2, 2008 || Mount Lemmon || Mount Lemmon Survey || V || align=right data-sort-value="0.91" | 910 m || 
|-id=416 bgcolor=#d6d6d6
| 353416 ||  || — || March 21, 2004 || Kitt Peak || Spacewatch || — || align=right | 3.5 km || 
|-id=417 bgcolor=#fefefe
| 353417 ||  || — || January 31, 2006 || Kitt Peak || Spacewatch || MAS || align=right data-sort-value="0.90" | 900 m || 
|-id=418 bgcolor=#E9E9E9
| 353418 ||  || — || September 3, 2007 || Mount Lemmon || Mount Lemmon Survey || — || align=right | 1.3 km || 
|-id=419 bgcolor=#fefefe
| 353419 ||  || — || September 4, 2008 || Kitt Peak || Spacewatch || V || align=right | 1.00 km || 
|-id=420 bgcolor=#E9E9E9
| 353420 ||  || — || December 29, 2008 || Mount Lemmon || Mount Lemmon Survey || — || align=right | 2.2 km || 
|-id=421 bgcolor=#E9E9E9
| 353421 ||  || — || September 17, 2003 || Kitt Peak || Spacewatch || MAR || align=right data-sort-value="0.83" | 830 m || 
|-id=422 bgcolor=#E9E9E9
| 353422 ||  || — || October 9, 2007 || Kitt Peak || Spacewatch || — || align=right | 2.5 km || 
|-id=423 bgcolor=#d6d6d6
| 353423 ||  || — || September 24, 2000 || Socorro || LINEAR || — || align=right | 2.3 km || 
|-id=424 bgcolor=#fefefe
| 353424 ||  || — || March 20, 1999 || Apache Point || SDSS || MAS || align=right data-sort-value="0.87" | 870 m || 
|-id=425 bgcolor=#E9E9E9
| 353425 ||  || — || August 1, 2010 || WISE || WISE || — || align=right | 2.6 km || 
|-id=426 bgcolor=#fefefe
| 353426 ||  || — || February 25, 2006 || Kitt Peak || Spacewatch || — || align=right | 1.1 km || 
|-id=427 bgcolor=#d6d6d6
| 353427 ||  || — || August 24, 2005 || Palomar || NEAT || — || align=right | 3.6 km || 
|-id=428 bgcolor=#d6d6d6
| 353428 ||  || — || August 21, 2006 || Kitt Peak || Spacewatch || — || align=right | 3.1 km || 
|-id=429 bgcolor=#E9E9E9
| 353429 ||  || — || June 8, 2011 || Haleakala || Pan-STARRS || — || align=right | 2.9 km || 
|-id=430 bgcolor=#fefefe
| 353430 ||  || — || October 4, 2004 || Palomar || NEAT || V || align=right data-sort-value="0.82" | 820 m || 
|-id=431 bgcolor=#fefefe
| 353431 ||  || — || January 25, 2006 || Kitt Peak || Spacewatch || NYS || align=right data-sort-value="0.76" | 760 m || 
|-id=432 bgcolor=#fefefe
| 353432 ||  || — || July 24, 2007 || Majorca || OAM Obs. || — || align=right | 1.3 km || 
|-id=433 bgcolor=#d6d6d6
| 353433 ||  || — || August 10, 1994 || La Silla || E. W. Elst || — || align=right | 4.4 km || 
|-id=434 bgcolor=#fefefe
| 353434 ||  || — || December 1, 2008 || Kitt Peak || Spacewatch || V || align=right data-sort-value="0.83" | 830 m || 
|-id=435 bgcolor=#fefefe
| 353435 ||  || — || November 26, 2005 || Kitt Peak || Spacewatch || — || align=right data-sort-value="0.90" | 900 m || 
|-id=436 bgcolor=#fefefe
| 353436 ||  || — || March 30, 2003 || Anderson Mesa || LONEOS || V || align=right data-sort-value="0.74" | 740 m || 
|-id=437 bgcolor=#d6d6d6
| 353437 ||  || — || November 16, 2006 || Mount Lemmon || Mount Lemmon Survey || — || align=right | 3.8 km || 
|-id=438 bgcolor=#d6d6d6
| 353438 ||  || — || October 16, 2006 || Catalina || CSS || — || align=right | 2.9 km || 
|-id=439 bgcolor=#d6d6d6
| 353439 ||  || — || February 2, 1997 || Kitt Peak || Spacewatch || — || align=right | 2.8 km || 
|-id=440 bgcolor=#fefefe
| 353440 ||  || — || August 19, 1995 || Xinglong || SCAP || — || align=right data-sort-value="0.96" | 960 m || 
|-id=441 bgcolor=#E9E9E9
| 353441 ||  || — || August 28, 2003 || Palomar || NEAT || — || align=right | 1.3 km || 
|-id=442 bgcolor=#fefefe
| 353442 ||  || — || June 17, 2007 || Kitt Peak || Spacewatch || — || align=right | 1.1 km || 
|-id=443 bgcolor=#fefefe
| 353443 ||  || — || January 23, 2006 || Mount Lemmon || Mount Lemmon Survey || V || align=right data-sort-value="0.67" | 670 m || 
|-id=444 bgcolor=#fefefe
| 353444 ||  || — || June 17, 2007 || Kitt Peak || Spacewatch || — || align=right | 1.3 km || 
|-id=445 bgcolor=#fefefe
| 353445 ||  || — || September 4, 2007 || Mount Lemmon || Mount Lemmon Survey || V || align=right data-sort-value="0.99" | 990 m || 
|-id=446 bgcolor=#E9E9E9
| 353446 ||  || — || December 18, 2003 || Kitt Peak || Spacewatch || — || align=right | 2.5 km || 
|-id=447 bgcolor=#E9E9E9
| 353447 ||  || — || December 13, 2007 || Socorro || LINEAR || — || align=right | 2.3 km || 
|-id=448 bgcolor=#fefefe
| 353448 ||  || — || September 5, 2000 || Apache Point || SDSS || V || align=right data-sort-value="0.98" | 980 m || 
|-id=449 bgcolor=#d6d6d6
| 353449 ||  || — || November 11, 2007 || Mount Lemmon || Mount Lemmon Survey || — || align=right | 3.6 km || 
|-id=450 bgcolor=#fefefe
| 353450 ||  || — || April 11, 2002 || Socorro || LINEAR || — || align=right | 1.3 km || 
|-id=451 bgcolor=#d6d6d6
| 353451 ||  || — || October 15, 2001 || Palomar || NEAT || — || align=right | 3.6 km || 
|-id=452 bgcolor=#E9E9E9
| 353452 ||  || — || March 4, 2005 || Kitt Peak || Spacewatch || MAR || align=right | 1.2 km || 
|-id=453 bgcolor=#fefefe
| 353453 ||  || — || February 25, 2007 || Mount Lemmon || Mount Lemmon Survey || FLO || align=right data-sort-value="0.67" | 670 m || 
|-id=454 bgcolor=#d6d6d6
| 353454 ||  || — || November 15, 2006 || Catalina || CSS || EOS || align=right | 2.6 km || 
|-id=455 bgcolor=#E9E9E9
| 353455 ||  || — || November 2, 2007 || Kitt Peak || Spacewatch || — || align=right | 2.0 km || 
|-id=456 bgcolor=#E9E9E9
| 353456 ||  || — || March 16, 2009 || Mount Lemmon || Mount Lemmon Survey || — || align=right | 2.4 km || 
|-id=457 bgcolor=#d6d6d6
| 353457 ||  || — || February 9, 2008 || Mount Lemmon || Mount Lemmon Survey || — || align=right | 2.9 km || 
|-id=458 bgcolor=#d6d6d6
| 353458 ||  || — || August 29, 2006 || Kitt Peak || Spacewatch || — || align=right | 3.5 km || 
|-id=459 bgcolor=#fefefe
| 353459 ||  || — || August 1, 2000 || Socorro || LINEAR || — || align=right | 1.0 km || 
|-id=460 bgcolor=#E9E9E9
| 353460 ||  || — || January 15, 2004 || Kitt Peak || Spacewatch || WIT || align=right | 1.1 km || 
|-id=461 bgcolor=#d6d6d6
| 353461 ||  || — || September 19, 2006 || Catalina || CSS || — || align=right | 2.8 km || 
|-id=462 bgcolor=#fefefe
| 353462 ||  || — || October 8, 1996 || Kitt Peak || Spacewatch || V || align=right data-sort-value="0.95" | 950 m || 
|-id=463 bgcolor=#fefefe
| 353463 ||  || — || December 28, 2005 || Kitt Peak || Spacewatch || NYS || align=right data-sort-value="0.64" | 640 m || 
|-id=464 bgcolor=#d6d6d6
| 353464 ||  || — || September 28, 2000 || Kitt Peak || Spacewatch || LIX || align=right | 2.9 km || 
|-id=465 bgcolor=#E9E9E9
| 353465 ||  || — || October 5, 2002 || Palomar || NEAT || HOF || align=right | 2.3 km || 
|-id=466 bgcolor=#d6d6d6
| 353466 ||  || — || December 17, 2001 || Kitt Peak || Spacewatch || — || align=right | 4.5 km || 
|-id=467 bgcolor=#d6d6d6
| 353467 ||  || — || October 22, 2006 || Kitt Peak || Spacewatch || — || align=right | 2.9 km || 
|-id=468 bgcolor=#fefefe
| 353468 ||  || — || February 8, 2002 || Kitt Peak || Spacewatch || — || align=right | 1.1 km || 
|-id=469 bgcolor=#fefefe
| 353469 ||  || — || September 24, 2008 || Kitt Peak || Spacewatch || FLO || align=right data-sort-value="0.58" | 580 m || 
|-id=470 bgcolor=#fefefe
| 353470 ||  || — || December 11, 2004 || Kitt Peak || Spacewatch || MAS || align=right data-sort-value="0.88" | 880 m || 
|-id=471 bgcolor=#d6d6d6
| 353471 ||  || — || August 31, 2000 || Socorro || LINEAR || — || align=right | 3.1 km || 
|-id=472 bgcolor=#fefefe
| 353472 ||  || — || July 30, 2000 || Socorro || LINEAR || — || align=right | 1.3 km || 
|-id=473 bgcolor=#E9E9E9
| 353473 ||  || — || March 19, 2010 || Kitt Peak || Spacewatch || — || align=right | 2.6 km || 
|-id=474 bgcolor=#fefefe
| 353474 ||  || — || June 27, 2007 || Kitt Peak || Spacewatch || — || align=right | 1.2 km || 
|-id=475 bgcolor=#d6d6d6
| 353475 ||  || — || June 3, 2010 || WISE || WISE || — || align=right | 6.1 km || 
|-id=476 bgcolor=#E9E9E9
| 353476 ||  || — || August 18, 2006 || Kitt Peak || Spacewatch || AST || align=right | 2.1 km || 
|-id=477 bgcolor=#d6d6d6
| 353477 ||  || — || August 31, 2005 || Kitt Peak || Spacewatch || — || align=right | 3.1 km || 
|-id=478 bgcolor=#d6d6d6
| 353478 ||  || — || April 14, 2008 || Kitt Peak || Spacewatch || 7:4 || align=right | 3.7 km || 
|-id=479 bgcolor=#d6d6d6
| 353479 ||  || — || April 25, 2003 || Kitt Peak || Spacewatch || EOS || align=right | 2.4 km || 
|-id=480 bgcolor=#d6d6d6
| 353480 ||  || — || August 26, 2001 || Kitt Peak || Spacewatch || KAR || align=right | 1.3 km || 
|-id=481 bgcolor=#E9E9E9
| 353481 ||  || — || February 26, 2008 || Mount Lemmon || Mount Lemmon Survey || EUN || align=right | 1.5 km || 
|-id=482 bgcolor=#fefefe
| 353482 ||  || — || October 1, 2008 || Kitt Peak || Spacewatch || — || align=right | 1.7 km || 
|-id=483 bgcolor=#fefefe
| 353483 ||  || — || September 18, 2004 || Socorro || LINEAR || V || align=right data-sort-value="0.78" | 780 m || 
|-id=484 bgcolor=#E9E9E9
| 353484 ||  || — || October 10, 2007 || Mount Lemmon || Mount Lemmon Survey || — || align=right | 1.8 km || 
|-id=485 bgcolor=#fefefe
| 353485 ||  || — || August 9, 2007 || Kitt Peak || Spacewatch || MAS || align=right data-sort-value="0.99" | 990 m || 
|-id=486 bgcolor=#d6d6d6
| 353486 ||  || — || September 9, 1977 || Palomar || PLS || — || align=right | 3.2 km || 
|-id=487 bgcolor=#d6d6d6
| 353487 ||  || — || October 4, 2000 || Socorro || LINEAR || — || align=right | 3.2 km || 
|-id=488 bgcolor=#d6d6d6
| 353488 ||  || — || December 23, 2001 || Kitt Peak || Spacewatch || — || align=right | 3.0 km || 
|-id=489 bgcolor=#d6d6d6
| 353489 ||  || — || December 4, 2007 || Kitt Peak || Spacewatch || — || align=right | 3.2 km || 
|-id=490 bgcolor=#E9E9E9
| 353490 ||  || — || January 15, 2009 || Kitt Peak || Spacewatch || — || align=right | 1.4 km || 
|-id=491 bgcolor=#fefefe
| 353491 ||  || — || January 30, 2006 || Kitt Peak || Spacewatch || — || align=right | 1.1 km || 
|-id=492 bgcolor=#fefefe
| 353492 ||  || — || April 4, 2010 || Catalina || CSS || — || align=right data-sort-value="0.96" | 960 m || 
|-id=493 bgcolor=#d6d6d6
| 353493 ||  || — || September 30, 2006 || Mount Lemmon || Mount Lemmon Survey || — || align=right | 3.4 km || 
|-id=494 bgcolor=#fefefe
| 353494 ||  || — || October 22, 2008 || Kitt Peak || Spacewatch || FLO || align=right data-sort-value="0.76" | 760 m || 
|-id=495 bgcolor=#fefefe
| 353495 ||  || — || October 1, 2000 || Socorro || LINEAR || — || align=right data-sort-value="0.90" | 900 m || 
|-id=496 bgcolor=#d6d6d6
| 353496 ||  || — || March 8, 2008 || Mount Lemmon || Mount Lemmon Survey || HYG || align=right | 2.9 km || 
|-id=497 bgcolor=#d6d6d6
| 353497 ||  || — || November 18, 2006 || Mount Lemmon || Mount Lemmon Survey || HYG || align=right | 3.1 km || 
|-id=498 bgcolor=#d6d6d6
| 353498 ||  || — || October 2, 2006 || Mount Lemmon || Mount Lemmon Survey || KAR || align=right | 1.4 km || 
|-id=499 bgcolor=#fefefe
| 353499 ||  || — || September 12, 2007 || Catalina || CSS || — || align=right | 1.1 km || 
|-id=500 bgcolor=#E9E9E9
| 353500 ||  || — || February 17, 2004 || Kitt Peak || Spacewatch || — || align=right | 3.2 km || 
|}

353501–353600 

|-bgcolor=#E9E9E9
| 353501 ||  || — || September 15, 2006 || Kitt Peak || Spacewatch || HOF || align=right | 3.0 km || 
|-id=502 bgcolor=#E9E9E9
| 353502 ||  || — || August 17, 2006 || Palomar || NEAT || — || align=right | 3.0 km || 
|-id=503 bgcolor=#d6d6d6
| 353503 ||  || — || June 15, 2010 || Mount Lemmon || Mount Lemmon Survey || EOS || align=right | 2.1 km || 
|-id=504 bgcolor=#E9E9E9
| 353504 ||  || — || June 17, 2005 || Mount Lemmon || Mount Lemmon Survey || fast? || align=right | 2.7 km || 
|-id=505 bgcolor=#E9E9E9
| 353505 ||  || — || October 30, 2007 || Catalina || CSS || — || align=right | 1.2 km || 
|-id=506 bgcolor=#E9E9E9
| 353506 ||  || — || August 17, 2006 || Palomar || NEAT || — || align=right | 2.7 km || 
|-id=507 bgcolor=#d6d6d6
| 353507 ||  || — || October 4, 2006 || Mount Lemmon || Mount Lemmon Survey || — || align=right | 3.5 km || 
|-id=508 bgcolor=#fefefe
| 353508 ||  || — || October 8, 1993 || Kitt Peak || Spacewatch || V || align=right data-sort-value="0.79" | 790 m || 
|-id=509 bgcolor=#E9E9E9
| 353509 ||  || — || May 4, 2005 || Kitt Peak || Spacewatch || WIT || align=right | 1.4 km || 
|-id=510 bgcolor=#fefefe
| 353510 ||  || — || March 26, 2006 || Kitt Peak || Spacewatch || MAS || align=right data-sort-value="0.80" | 800 m || 
|-id=511 bgcolor=#d6d6d6
| 353511 ||  || — || December 30, 2007 || Mount Lemmon || Mount Lemmon Survey || — || align=right | 3.1 km || 
|-id=512 bgcolor=#fefefe
| 353512 ||  || — || April 13, 2002 || Kitt Peak || Spacewatch || V || align=right data-sort-value="0.79" | 790 m || 
|-id=513 bgcolor=#d6d6d6
| 353513 ||  || — || July 4, 2005 || Mount Lemmon || Mount Lemmon Survey || EOS || align=right | 2.1 km || 
|-id=514 bgcolor=#E9E9E9
| 353514 ||  || — || April 4, 2005 || Mount Lemmon || Mount Lemmon Survey || — || align=right | 2.4 km || 
|-id=515 bgcolor=#d6d6d6
| 353515 ||  || — || March 23, 2004 || Kitt Peak || Spacewatch || — || align=right | 3.6 km || 
|-id=516 bgcolor=#fefefe
| 353516 ||  || — || March 21, 1999 || Apache Point || SDSS || — || align=right | 1.1 km || 
|-id=517 bgcolor=#E9E9E9
| 353517 ||  || — || February 23, 2004 || Socorro || LINEAR || XIZ || align=right | 1.8 km || 
|-id=518 bgcolor=#d6d6d6
| 353518 ||  || — || October 12, 2006 || Kitt Peak || Spacewatch || — || align=right | 2.3 km || 
|-id=519 bgcolor=#d6d6d6
| 353519 ||  || — || November 19, 2006 || Kitt Peak || Spacewatch || — || align=right | 2.5 km || 
|-id=520 bgcolor=#E9E9E9
| 353520 ||  || — || February 28, 2009 || Kitt Peak || Spacewatch || HOF || align=right | 3.1 km || 
|-id=521 bgcolor=#d6d6d6
| 353521 ||  || — || April 7, 2003 || Kitt Peak || Spacewatch || — || align=right | 3.2 km || 
|-id=522 bgcolor=#d6d6d6
| 353522 ||  || — || November 17, 2006 || Mount Lemmon || Mount Lemmon Survey || — || align=right | 2.3 km || 
|-id=523 bgcolor=#fefefe
| 353523 ||  || — || January 31, 2006 || Kitt Peak || Spacewatch || NYS || align=right data-sort-value="0.89" | 890 m || 
|-id=524 bgcolor=#d6d6d6
| 353524 ||  || — || October 3, 2006 || Mount Lemmon || Mount Lemmon Survey || — || align=right | 2.0 km || 
|-id=525 bgcolor=#E9E9E9
| 353525 ||  || — || October 4, 2002 || Socorro || LINEAR || — || align=right | 2.6 km || 
|-id=526 bgcolor=#E9E9E9
| 353526 ||  || — || December 16, 2007 || Kitt Peak || Spacewatch || AGN || align=right | 1.3 km || 
|-id=527 bgcolor=#E9E9E9
| 353527 ||  || — || October 9, 2007 || Mount Lemmon || Mount Lemmon Survey || — || align=right | 2.0 km || 
|-id=528 bgcolor=#E9E9E9
| 353528 ||  || — || March 17, 2005 || Kitt Peak || Spacewatch || NEM || align=right | 2.4 km || 
|-id=529 bgcolor=#E9E9E9
| 353529 ||  || — || March 27, 2000 || Kitt Peak || Spacewatch || AGN || align=right | 1.3 km || 
|-id=530 bgcolor=#d6d6d6
| 353530 ||  || — || April 4, 2003 || Kitt Peak || Spacewatch || — || align=right | 5.6 km || 
|-id=531 bgcolor=#d6d6d6
| 353531 ||  || — || August 26, 2005 || Palomar || NEAT || ELF || align=right | 6.8 km || 
|-id=532 bgcolor=#d6d6d6
| 353532 ||  || — || February 20, 2009 || Kitt Peak || Spacewatch || CHA || align=right | 1.9 km || 
|-id=533 bgcolor=#d6d6d6
| 353533 ||  || — || August 6, 2005 || Palomar || NEAT || HYG || align=right | 2.7 km || 
|-id=534 bgcolor=#d6d6d6
| 353534 ||  || — || December 17, 2001 || Socorro || LINEAR || EOS || align=right | 2.0 km || 
|-id=535 bgcolor=#d6d6d6
| 353535 ||  || — || November 30, 1997 || Kitt Peak || Spacewatch || KORfast? || align=right | 1.5 km || 
|-id=536 bgcolor=#E9E9E9
| 353536 ||  || — || October 16, 2006 || Mount Lemmon || Mount Lemmon Survey || AGN || align=right | 1.4 km || 
|-id=537 bgcolor=#E9E9E9
| 353537 ||  || — || December 1, 2003 || Kitt Peak || Spacewatch || RAF || align=right | 1.3 km || 
|-id=538 bgcolor=#E9E9E9
| 353538 ||  || — || September 19, 2006 || Kitt Peak || Spacewatch || AGN || align=right | 1.3 km || 
|-id=539 bgcolor=#fefefe
| 353539 ||  || — || April 9, 2010 || Mount Lemmon || Mount Lemmon Survey || — || align=right data-sort-value="0.95" | 950 m || 
|-id=540 bgcolor=#d6d6d6
| 353540 ||  || — || March 10, 1997 || Kitt Peak || Spacewatch || EOS || align=right | 1.8 km || 
|-id=541 bgcolor=#E9E9E9
| 353541 ||  || — || December 13, 2007 || Socorro || LINEAR || AGN || align=right | 1.4 km || 
|-id=542 bgcolor=#d6d6d6
| 353542 ||  || — || August 28, 2005 || Kitt Peak || Spacewatch || HYG || align=right | 2.9 km || 
|-id=543 bgcolor=#d6d6d6
| 353543 ||  || — || August 15, 2005 || Siding Spring || SSS || — || align=right | 3.9 km || 
|-id=544 bgcolor=#E9E9E9
| 353544 ||  || — || March 3, 2000 || Kitt Peak || Spacewatch || NEM || align=right | 2.4 km || 
|-id=545 bgcolor=#E9E9E9
| 353545 ||  || — || September 26, 2011 || Kitt Peak || Spacewatch || — || align=right | 2.6 km || 
|-id=546 bgcolor=#E9E9E9
| 353546 ||  || — || September 20, 2006 || Anderson Mesa || LONEOS || AGN || align=right | 1.3 km || 
|-id=547 bgcolor=#E9E9E9
| 353547 ||  || — || August 28, 2006 || Catalina || CSS || — || align=right | 2.4 km || 
|-id=548 bgcolor=#E9E9E9
| 353548 ||  || — || September 14, 2006 || Kitt Peak || Spacewatch || WIT || align=right | 1.3 km || 
|-id=549 bgcolor=#E9E9E9
| 353549 ||  || — || August 24, 2006 || Pises || Pises Obs. || WIT || align=right | 1.2 km || 
|-id=550 bgcolor=#d6d6d6
| 353550 ||  || — || November 19, 2000 || Anderson Mesa || LONEOS || EUP || align=right | 4.3 km || 
|-id=551 bgcolor=#d6d6d6
| 353551 ||  || — || April 2, 2009 || Kitt Peak || Spacewatch || — || align=right | 3.0 km || 
|-id=552 bgcolor=#d6d6d6
| 353552 ||  || — || August 2, 2000 || Kitt Peak || Spacewatch || — || align=right | 2.6 km || 
|-id=553 bgcolor=#d6d6d6
| 353553 ||  || — || October 27, 2006 || Catalina || CSS || EOS || align=right | 2.1 km || 
|-id=554 bgcolor=#E9E9E9
| 353554 ||  || — || August 28, 2006 || Kitt Peak || Spacewatch || — || align=right | 2.3 km || 
|-id=555 bgcolor=#E9E9E9
| 353555 ||  || — || August 17, 2006 || Palomar || NEAT || HEN || align=right | 1.1 km || 
|-id=556 bgcolor=#d6d6d6
| 353556 ||  || — || November 13, 2006 || Catalina || CSS || — || align=right | 3.4 km || 
|-id=557 bgcolor=#d6d6d6
| 353557 ||  || — || November 11, 2006 || Kitt Peak || Spacewatch || — || align=right | 3.4 km || 
|-id=558 bgcolor=#d6d6d6
| 353558 ||  || — || September 28, 2006 || Mount Lemmon || Mount Lemmon Survey || THM || align=right | 2.2 km || 
|-id=559 bgcolor=#d6d6d6
| 353559 ||  || — || September 24, 2000 || Anderson Mesa || LONEOS || — || align=right | 3.3 km || 
|-id=560 bgcolor=#d6d6d6
| 353560 ||  || — || March 15, 2004 || Kitt Peak || Spacewatch || KOR || align=right | 1.3 km || 
|-id=561 bgcolor=#d6d6d6
| 353561 ||  || — || November 16, 2006 || Kitt Peak || Spacewatch || — || align=right | 3.2 km || 
|-id=562 bgcolor=#E9E9E9
| 353562 ||  || — || September 15, 2006 || Kitt Peak || Spacewatch || — || align=right | 2.2 km || 
|-id=563 bgcolor=#E9E9E9
| 353563 ||  || — || September 18, 2006 || Kitt Peak || Spacewatch || — || align=right | 2.5 km || 
|-id=564 bgcolor=#d6d6d6
| 353564 ||  || — || August 4, 2005 || Palomar || NEAT || — || align=right | 3.1 km || 
|-id=565 bgcolor=#E9E9E9
| 353565 ||  || — || August 28, 2006 || Kitt Peak || Spacewatch || WIT || align=right | 1.2 km || 
|-id=566 bgcolor=#E9E9E9
| 353566 ||  || — || October 4, 2002 || Palomar || NEAT || NEM || align=right | 2.7 km || 
|-id=567 bgcolor=#E9E9E9
| 353567 ||  || — || October 15, 2002 || Palomar || NEAT || — || align=right | 2.5 km || 
|-id=568 bgcolor=#d6d6d6
| 353568 ||  || — || August 20, 2000 || Kitt Peak || Spacewatch || EOS || align=right | 1.8 km || 
|-id=569 bgcolor=#d6d6d6
| 353569 ||  || — || November 5, 2007 || Mount Lemmon || Mount Lemmon Survey || KOR || align=right | 1.7 km || 
|-id=570 bgcolor=#E9E9E9
| 353570 ||  || — || February 20, 2009 || Kitt Peak || Spacewatch || — || align=right | 3.7 km || 
|-id=571 bgcolor=#d6d6d6
| 353571 ||  || — || November 10, 2006 || Kitt Peak || Spacewatch || EOS || align=right | 2.5 km || 
|-id=572 bgcolor=#d6d6d6
| 353572 ||  || — || July 29, 2005 || Palomar || NEAT || HYG || align=right | 3.5 km || 
|-id=573 bgcolor=#d6d6d6
| 353573 ||  || — || February 23, 2003 || Campo Imperatore || CINEOS || — || align=right | 3.7 km || 
|-id=574 bgcolor=#E9E9E9
| 353574 ||  || — || January 17, 2004 || Kitt Peak || Spacewatch || — || align=right | 1.6 km || 
|-id=575 bgcolor=#d6d6d6
| 353575 ||  || — || February 10, 2002 || Socorro || LINEAR || — || align=right | 3.5 km || 
|-id=576 bgcolor=#d6d6d6
| 353576 ||  || — || April 4, 2003 || Kitt Peak || Spacewatch || — || align=right | 3.2 km || 
|-id=577 bgcolor=#d6d6d6
| 353577 Gediminas ||  ||  || January 5, 2008 || Baldone || K. Černis, I. Eglītis || — || align=right | 2.0 km || 
|-id=578 bgcolor=#E9E9E9
| 353578 ||  || — || September 20, 2006 || Kitt Peak || Spacewatch || NEM || align=right | 2.5 km || 
|-id=579 bgcolor=#fefefe
| 353579 ||  || — || March 9, 2002 || Palomar || NEAT || — || align=right data-sort-value="0.95" | 950 m || 
|-id=580 bgcolor=#d6d6d6
| 353580 ||  || — || September 16, 2006 || Catalina || CSS || EOS || align=right | 2.2 km || 
|-id=581 bgcolor=#d6d6d6
| 353581 ||  || — || December 13, 2006 || Catalina || CSS || — || align=right | 4.4 km || 
|-id=582 bgcolor=#d6d6d6
| 353582 ||  || — || September 26, 2000 || Anderson Mesa || LONEOS || LIX || align=right | 5.4 km || 
|-id=583 bgcolor=#d6d6d6
| 353583 ||  || — || October 19, 2006 || Kitt Peak || Spacewatch || — || align=right | 3.5 km || 
|-id=584 bgcolor=#fefefe
| 353584 ||  || — || March 20, 2010 || Kitt Peak || Spacewatch || V || align=right data-sort-value="0.73" | 730 m || 
|-id=585 bgcolor=#d6d6d6
| 353585 ||  || — || October 3, 2006 || Mount Lemmon || Mount Lemmon Survey || — || align=right | 2.5 km || 
|-id=586 bgcolor=#d6d6d6
| 353586 ||  || — || October 3, 2006 || Mount Lemmon || Mount Lemmon Survey || — || align=right | 2.3 km || 
|-id=587 bgcolor=#d6d6d6
| 353587 ||  || — || December 5, 2002 || Kitt Peak || Spacewatch || KOR || align=right | 1.5 km || 
|-id=588 bgcolor=#d6d6d6
| 353588 ||  || — || July 21, 2006 || Mount Lemmon || Mount Lemmon Survey || NAE || align=right | 3.0 km || 
|-id=589 bgcolor=#E9E9E9
| 353589 ||  || — || September 19, 2006 || Eskridge || G. Hug || — || align=right | 3.0 km || 
|-id=590 bgcolor=#d6d6d6
| 353590 ||  || — || April 23, 2009 || Kitt Peak || Spacewatch || ALA || align=right | 4.5 km || 
|-id=591 bgcolor=#E9E9E9
| 353591 ||  || — || September 8, 2011 || Kitt Peak || Spacewatch || — || align=right | 2.1 km || 
|-id=592 bgcolor=#E9E9E9
| 353592 ||  || — || November 13, 2007 || Kitt Peak || Spacewatch || — || align=right | 2.2 km || 
|-id=593 bgcolor=#d6d6d6
| 353593 ||  || — || July 6, 2005 || Kitt Peak || Spacewatch || HYG || align=right | 3.0 km || 
|-id=594 bgcolor=#d6d6d6
| 353594 ||  || — || November 10, 2006 || Lulin || Lulin Obs. || EOS || align=right | 2.7 km || 
|-id=595 bgcolor=#d6d6d6
| 353595 Grancanaria ||  ||  || October 4, 2011 || La Sagra || OAM Obs. || — || align=right | 3.3 km || 
|-id=596 bgcolor=#E9E9E9
| 353596 ||  || — || January 25, 2009 || Kitt Peak || Spacewatch || — || align=right | 1.1 km || 
|-id=597 bgcolor=#E9E9E9
| 353597 ||  || — || May 19, 2010 || Catalina || CSS || — || align=right | 1.6 km || 
|-id=598 bgcolor=#d6d6d6
| 353598 ||  || — || September 29, 2005 || Kitt Peak || Spacewatch || — || align=right | 3.7 km || 
|-id=599 bgcolor=#d6d6d6
| 353599 ||  || — || July 10, 2005 || Siding Spring || SSS || — || align=right | 4.1 km || 
|-id=600 bgcolor=#d6d6d6
| 353600 ||  || — || September 3, 2000 || Socorro || LINEAR || — || align=right | 3.4 km || 
|}

353601–353700 

|-bgcolor=#d6d6d6
| 353601 ||  || — || July 18, 2005 || Palomar || NEAT || — || align=right | 2.7 km || 
|-id=602 bgcolor=#d6d6d6
| 353602 ||  || — || September 20, 2000 || Kitt Peak || Spacewatch || HYG || align=right | 3.9 km || 
|-id=603 bgcolor=#d6d6d6
| 353603 ||  || — || March 21, 1998 || Kitt Peak || Spacewatch || — || align=right | 4.1 km || 
|-id=604 bgcolor=#d6d6d6
| 353604 ||  || — || November 16, 2006 || Mount Lemmon || Mount Lemmon Survey || EOS || align=right | 2.2 km || 
|-id=605 bgcolor=#fefefe
| 353605 ||  || — || May 7, 2000 || Socorro || LINEAR || — || align=right | 1.2 km || 
|-id=606 bgcolor=#d6d6d6
| 353606 ||  || — || November 2, 2000 || Kitt Peak || Spacewatch || HYG || align=right | 2.9 km || 
|-id=607 bgcolor=#d6d6d6
| 353607 ||  || — || March 27, 2003 || Kitt Peak || Spacewatch || — || align=right | 3.3 km || 
|-id=608 bgcolor=#E9E9E9
| 353608 ||  || — || November 20, 2007 || Kitt Peak || Spacewatch || AGN || align=right | 1.1 km || 
|-id=609 bgcolor=#fefefe
| 353609 ||  || — || August 23, 2004 || Kitt Peak || Spacewatch || — || align=right data-sort-value="0.83" | 830 m || 
|-id=610 bgcolor=#d6d6d6
| 353610 ||  || — || June 24, 2010 || Mount Lemmon || Mount Lemmon Survey || — || align=right | 4.6 km || 
|-id=611 bgcolor=#fefefe
| 353611 ||  || — || September 19, 2007 || Kitt Peak || Spacewatch || — || align=right | 1.1 km || 
|-id=612 bgcolor=#d6d6d6
| 353612 ||  || — || September 12, 1994 || Kitt Peak || Spacewatch || VER || align=right | 2.4 km || 
|-id=613 bgcolor=#d6d6d6
| 353613 ||  || — || September 25, 1995 || Kitt Peak || Spacewatch || — || align=right | 2.5 km || 
|-id=614 bgcolor=#d6d6d6
| 353614 ||  || — || October 3, 2005 || Catalina || CSS || — || align=right | 5.2 km || 
|-id=615 bgcolor=#E9E9E9
| 353615 ||  || — || December 5, 2007 || Kitt Peak || Spacewatch || WIT || align=right | 1.3 km || 
|-id=616 bgcolor=#E9E9E9
| 353616 ||  || — || November 1, 2007 || Kitt Peak || Spacewatch || — || align=right data-sort-value="0.99" | 990 m || 
|-id=617 bgcolor=#E9E9E9
| 353617 ||  || — || December 24, 1998 || Kitt Peak || Spacewatch || AGN || align=right | 1.4 km || 
|-id=618 bgcolor=#d6d6d6
| 353618 ||  || — || September 28, 2006 || Mount Lemmon || Mount Lemmon Survey || EOS || align=right | 2.4 km || 
|-id=619 bgcolor=#d6d6d6
| 353619 ||  || — || May 15, 2005 || Mount Lemmon || Mount Lemmon Survey || — || align=right | 3.5 km || 
|-id=620 bgcolor=#E9E9E9
| 353620 ||  || — || February 22, 2004 || Kitt Peak || Spacewatch || AGN || align=right | 1.3 km || 
|-id=621 bgcolor=#E9E9E9
| 353621 ||  || — || November 5, 2007 || Kitt Peak || Spacewatch || NEM || align=right | 2.5 km || 
|-id=622 bgcolor=#d6d6d6
| 353622 ||  || — || February 13, 2008 || Kitt Peak || Spacewatch || HYG || align=right | 2.8 km || 
|-id=623 bgcolor=#d6d6d6
| 353623 ||  || — || September 25, 2000 || Kitt Peak || Spacewatch || EOS || align=right | 2.9 km || 
|-id=624 bgcolor=#d6d6d6
| 353624 ||  || — || October 18, 2011 || Kitt Peak || Spacewatch || EOS || align=right | 2.7 km || 
|-id=625 bgcolor=#d6d6d6
| 353625 ||  || — || March 4, 2008 || Mount Lemmon || Mount Lemmon Survey || VER || align=right | 3.0 km || 
|-id=626 bgcolor=#fefefe
| 353626 ||  || — || October 7, 2007 || Catalina || CSS || ERI || align=right | 2.2 km || 
|-id=627 bgcolor=#E9E9E9
| 353627 ||  || — || July 18, 2006 || Lulin || Lulin Obs. || — || align=right | 1.3 km || 
|-id=628 bgcolor=#d6d6d6
| 353628 ||  || — || December 28, 2005 || Socorro || LINEAR || SYL7:4 || align=right | 6.5 km || 
|-id=629 bgcolor=#fefefe
| 353629 ||  || — || July 22, 2007 || Lulin || Lulin Obs. || — || align=right | 1.0 km || 
|-id=630 bgcolor=#d6d6d6
| 353630 ||  || — || October 12, 1998 || Kitt Peak || Spacewatch || 7:4 || align=right | 4.3 km || 
|-id=631 bgcolor=#d6d6d6
| 353631 ||  || — || February 8, 2008 || Catalina || CSS || — || align=right | 4.9 km || 
|-id=632 bgcolor=#E9E9E9
| 353632 ||  || — || August 27, 2006 || Kitt Peak || Spacewatch || HOF || align=right | 4.2 km || 
|-id=633 bgcolor=#d6d6d6
| 353633 ||  || — || September 29, 2000 || Kitt Peak || Spacewatch || HYG || align=right | 2.5 km || 
|-id=634 bgcolor=#d6d6d6
| 353634 ||  || — || November 17, 2006 || Kitt Peak || Spacewatch || — || align=right | 3.8 km || 
|-id=635 bgcolor=#d6d6d6
| 353635 ||  || — || April 29, 2008 || Mount Lemmon || Mount Lemmon Survey || LUT || align=right | 4.3 km || 
|-id=636 bgcolor=#E9E9E9
| 353636 ||  || — || December 31, 2007 || Kitt Peak || Spacewatch || HOF || align=right | 3.1 km || 
|-id=637 bgcolor=#E9E9E9
| 353637 ||  || — || August 27, 2006 || Kitt Peak || Spacewatch || WIT || align=right | 1.2 km || 
|-id=638 bgcolor=#E9E9E9
| 353638 ||  || — || September 18, 2006 || Kitt Peak || Spacewatch || HOF || align=right | 2.9 km || 
|-id=639 bgcolor=#d6d6d6
| 353639 ||  || — || May 3, 2009 || Kitt Peak || Spacewatch || EOS || align=right | 3.5 km || 
|-id=640 bgcolor=#d6d6d6
| 353640 ||  || — || December 7, 2005 || Kitt Peak || Spacewatch || 7:4 || align=right | 4.5 km || 
|-id=641 bgcolor=#d6d6d6
| 353641 ||  || — || September 14, 2006 || Kitt Peak || Spacewatch || CHA || align=right | 2.4 km || 
|-id=642 bgcolor=#d6d6d6
| 353642 ||  || — || September 13, 2005 || Kitt Peak || Spacewatch || — || align=right | 2.3 km || 
|-id=643 bgcolor=#E9E9E9
| 353643 ||  || — || March 13, 2005 || Mount Lemmon || Mount Lemmon Survey || — || align=right | 3.0 km || 
|-id=644 bgcolor=#E9E9E9
| 353644 ||  || — || August 29, 2006 || Kitt Peak || Spacewatch || HOF || align=right | 2.8 km || 
|-id=645 bgcolor=#d6d6d6
| 353645 ||  || — || July 30, 2005 || Palomar || NEAT || URS || align=right | 3.8 km || 
|-id=646 bgcolor=#E9E9E9
| 353646 ||  || — || October 18, 2007 || Mount Lemmon || Mount Lemmon Survey || — || align=right | 1.0 km || 
|-id=647 bgcolor=#E9E9E9
| 353647 ||  || — || September 15, 2006 || Kitt Peak || Spacewatch || — || align=right | 2.4 km || 
|-id=648 bgcolor=#d6d6d6
| 353648 ||  || — || October 13, 2006 || Kitt Peak || Spacewatch || — || align=right | 3.2 km || 
|-id=649 bgcolor=#E9E9E9
| 353649 ||  || — || April 2, 2005 || Kitt Peak || Spacewatch || AGN || align=right | 1.5 km || 
|-id=650 bgcolor=#d6d6d6
| 353650 ||  || — || August 31, 2005 || Kitt Peak || Spacewatch || HYG || align=right | 2.8 km || 
|-id=651 bgcolor=#E9E9E9
| 353651 ||  || — || October 19, 2006 || Mount Lemmon || Mount Lemmon Survey || AGN || align=right | 1.5 km || 
|-id=652 bgcolor=#fefefe
| 353652 ||  || — || September 4, 2007 || Mount Lemmon || Mount Lemmon Survey || NYS || align=right data-sort-value="0.73" | 730 m || 
|-id=653 bgcolor=#d6d6d6
| 353653 ||  || — || August 9, 2005 || Cerro Tololo || L. H. Wasserman || — || align=right | 2.5 km || 
|-id=654 bgcolor=#d6d6d6
| 353654 ||  || — || October 3, 2000 || Kitt Peak || Spacewatch || HYG || align=right | 2.7 km || 
|-id=655 bgcolor=#d6d6d6
| 353655 ||  || — || March 1, 2008 || Kitt Peak || Spacewatch || 7:4 || align=right | 3.9 km || 
|-id=656 bgcolor=#fefefe
| 353656 ||  || — || October 13, 2004 || Kitt Peak || Spacewatch || V || align=right data-sort-value="0.76" | 760 m || 
|-id=657 bgcolor=#d6d6d6
| 353657 ||  || — || November 3, 2000 || Kitt Peak || Spacewatch || EOS || align=right | 2.0 km || 
|-id=658 bgcolor=#d6d6d6
| 353658 ||  || — || January 21, 2002 || Kitt Peak || Spacewatch || HYG || align=right | 3.4 km || 
|-id=659 bgcolor=#d6d6d6
| 353659 ||  || — || September 28, 2000 || Kitt Peak || Spacewatch || — || align=right | 3.9 km || 
|-id=660 bgcolor=#d6d6d6
| 353660 ||  || — || July 4, 2005 || Mount Lemmon || Mount Lemmon Survey || — || align=right | 3.4 km || 
|-id=661 bgcolor=#d6d6d6
| 353661 ||  || — || September 18, 2001 || Apache Point || SDSS || — || align=right | 3.1 km || 
|-id=662 bgcolor=#E9E9E9
| 353662 ||  || — || February 12, 2004 || Kitt Peak || Spacewatch || — || align=right | 2.4 km || 
|-id=663 bgcolor=#fefefe
| 353663 ||  || — || September 27, 1997 || Kitt Peak || Spacewatch || — || align=right | 1.1 km || 
|-id=664 bgcolor=#E9E9E9
| 353664 ||  || — || June 1, 2005 || Mount Lemmon || Mount Lemmon Survey || — || align=right | 2.8 km || 
|-id=665 bgcolor=#d6d6d6
| 353665 ||  || — || October 21, 2003 || Socorro || LINEAR || 3:2 || align=right | 4.0 km || 
|-id=666 bgcolor=#E9E9E9
| 353666 ||  || — || August 16, 2006 || Palomar || NEAT || GEF || align=right | 1.4 km || 
|-id=667 bgcolor=#d6d6d6
| 353667 ||  || — || October 16, 2006 || Catalina || CSS || — || align=right | 3.4 km || 
|-id=668 bgcolor=#d6d6d6
| 353668 ||  || — || November 20, 2006 || Kitt Peak || Spacewatch || — || align=right | 2.7 km || 
|-id=669 bgcolor=#E9E9E9
| 353669 ||  || — || February 18, 2004 || Kitt Peak || Spacewatch || DOR || align=right | 3.8 km || 
|-id=670 bgcolor=#d6d6d6
| 353670 ||  || — || November 18, 2007 || Mount Lemmon || Mount Lemmon Survey || URS || align=right | 4.9 km || 
|-id=671 bgcolor=#d6d6d6
| 353671 ||  || — || February 13, 2008 || Mount Lemmon || Mount Lemmon Survey || — || align=right | 3.3 km || 
|-id=672 bgcolor=#E9E9E9
| 353672 ||  || — || December 14, 2007 || Kitt Peak || Spacewatch || HEN || align=right | 1.4 km || 
|-id=673 bgcolor=#E9E9E9
| 353673 ||  || — || March 1, 2009 || Kitt Peak || Spacewatch || — || align=right | 2.6 km || 
|-id=674 bgcolor=#E9E9E9
| 353674 ||  || — || September 19, 2006 || Anderson Mesa || LONEOS || AST || align=right | 2.2 km || 
|-id=675 bgcolor=#d6d6d6
| 353675 ||  || — || November 20, 2006 || Mount Lemmon || Mount Lemmon Survey || THM || align=right | 2.3 km || 
|-id=676 bgcolor=#E9E9E9
| 353676 ||  || — || April 6, 2005 || Mount Lemmon || Mount Lemmon Survey || — || align=right | 2.5 km || 
|-id=677 bgcolor=#d6d6d6
| 353677 ||  || — || January 18, 2002 || Cima Ekar || ADAS || EOS || align=right | 3.9 km || 
|-id=678 bgcolor=#d6d6d6
| 353678 ||  || — || October 23, 2003 || Kitt Peak || Spacewatch || 3:2 || align=right | 4.4 km || 
|-id=679 bgcolor=#E9E9E9
| 353679 ||  || — || March 15, 2004 || Kitt Peak || Spacewatch || AST || align=right | 1.9 km || 
|-id=680 bgcolor=#E9E9E9
| 353680 ||  || — || January 19, 2004 || Kitt Peak || Spacewatch || WIT || align=right | 1.3 km || 
|-id=681 bgcolor=#E9E9E9
| 353681 ||  || — || October 18, 2007 || Kitt Peak || Spacewatch || RAF || align=right | 1.3 km || 
|-id=682 bgcolor=#E9E9E9
| 353682 ||  || — || June 11, 2011 || Haleakala || Pan-STARRS || — || align=right | 2.8 km || 
|-id=683 bgcolor=#E9E9E9
| 353683 ||  || — || November 14, 2002 || Kitt Peak || Spacewatch || — || align=right | 2.3 km || 
|-id=684 bgcolor=#E9E9E9
| 353684 ||  || — || September 16, 2006 || Catalina || CSS || — || align=right | 3.8 km || 
|-id=685 bgcolor=#fefefe
| 353685 ||  || — || March 31, 2003 || Piszkéstető || K. Sárneczky || V || align=right data-sort-value="0.76" | 760 m || 
|-id=686 bgcolor=#E9E9E9
| 353686 ||  || — || March 31, 2009 || Kitt Peak || Spacewatch || AGN || align=right | 1.4 km || 
|-id=687 bgcolor=#fefefe
| 353687 ||  || — || August 22, 2007 || Anderson Mesa || LONEOS || — || align=right | 1.0 km || 
|-id=688 bgcolor=#d6d6d6
| 353688 ||  || — || October 22, 2006 || Mount Lemmon || Mount Lemmon Survey || EOS || align=right | 2.2 km || 
|-id=689 bgcolor=#d6d6d6
| 353689 ||  || — || February 12, 2008 || Mount Lemmon || Mount Lemmon Survey || — || align=right | 4.4 km || 
|-id=690 bgcolor=#d6d6d6
| 353690 ||  || — || September 17, 2006 || Kitt Peak || Spacewatch || KOR || align=right | 1.6 km || 
|-id=691 bgcolor=#d6d6d6
| 353691 ||  || — || March 9, 1999 || Kitt Peak || Spacewatch || CHA || align=right | 2.2 km || 
|-id=692 bgcolor=#d6d6d6
| 353692 ||  || — || October 21, 2003 || Kitt Peak || Spacewatch || 3:2 || align=right | 5.0 km || 
|-id=693 bgcolor=#E9E9E9
| 353693 ||  || — || November 5, 2007 || Mount Lemmon || Mount Lemmon Survey || HEN || align=right | 1.1 km || 
|-id=694 bgcolor=#E9E9E9
| 353694 ||  || — || August 28, 2006 || Anderson Mesa || LONEOS || — || align=right | 2.3 km || 
|-id=695 bgcolor=#fefefe
| 353695 ||  || — || December 30, 2008 || Kitt Peak || Spacewatch || V || align=right data-sort-value="0.89" | 890 m || 
|-id=696 bgcolor=#E9E9E9
| 353696 ||  || — || February 14, 2009 || Kitt Peak || Spacewatch || — || align=right | 2.0 km || 
|-id=697 bgcolor=#d6d6d6
| 353697 ||  || — || September 28, 2006 || Mount Lemmon || Mount Lemmon Survey || — || align=right | 3.2 km || 
|-id=698 bgcolor=#d6d6d6
| 353698 ||  || — || August 29, 2005 || Kitt Peak || Spacewatch || EOS || align=right | 2.0 km || 
|-id=699 bgcolor=#d6d6d6
| 353699 ||  || — || August 28, 2005 || Siding Spring || SSS || — || align=right | 3.7 km || 
|-id=700 bgcolor=#d6d6d6
| 353700 ||  || — || August 31, 2005 || Kitt Peak || Spacewatch || EOS || align=right | 2.1 km || 
|}

353701–353800 

|-bgcolor=#E9E9E9
| 353701 ||  || — || February 11, 2004 || Kitt Peak || Spacewatch || — || align=right | 2.2 km || 
|-id=702 bgcolor=#d6d6d6
| 353702 ||  || — || January 20, 1996 || Kitt Peak || Spacewatch || — || align=right | 3.6 km || 
|-id=703 bgcolor=#d6d6d6
| 353703 ||  || — || August 30, 2005 || Kitt Peak || Spacewatch || VER || align=right | 4.4 km || 
|-id=704 bgcolor=#d6d6d6
| 353704 ||  || — || October 26, 2005 || Kitt Peak || Spacewatch || SYL7:4 || align=right | 4.6 km || 
|-id=705 bgcolor=#d6d6d6
| 353705 ||  || — || August 27, 2005 || Anderson Mesa || LONEOS || — || align=right | 3.9 km || 
|-id=706 bgcolor=#d6d6d6
| 353706 ||  || — || October 25, 2000 || Socorro || LINEAR || — || align=right | 3.3 km || 
|-id=707 bgcolor=#d6d6d6
| 353707 ||  || — || August 27, 2005 || Palomar || NEAT || — || align=right | 3.5 km || 
|-id=708 bgcolor=#fefefe
| 353708 ||  || — || January 26, 2006 || Kitt Peak || Spacewatch || — || align=right | 1.9 km || 
|-id=709 bgcolor=#d6d6d6
| 353709 ||  || — || February 8, 2002 || Palomar || NEAT || — || align=right | 4.5 km || 
|-id=710 bgcolor=#d6d6d6
| 353710 ||  || — || August 31, 2005 || Kitt Peak || Spacewatch || EOS || align=right | 2.1 km || 
|-id=711 bgcolor=#E9E9E9
| 353711 ||  || — || September 30, 2006 || Catalina || CSS || — || align=right | 2.7 km || 
|-id=712 bgcolor=#d6d6d6
| 353712 ||  || — || November 16, 2006 || Kitt Peak || Spacewatch || — || align=right | 2.5 km || 
|-id=713 bgcolor=#d6d6d6
| 353713 ||  || — || October 25, 2005 || Catalina || CSS || ALA || align=right | 5.6 km || 
|-id=714 bgcolor=#d6d6d6
| 353714 ||  || — || July 31, 2010 || WISE || WISE || — || align=right | 6.9 km || 
|-id=715 bgcolor=#d6d6d6
| 353715 ||  || — || June 29, 2005 || Kitt Peak || Spacewatch || EOS || align=right | 2.1 km || 
|-id=716 bgcolor=#fefefe
| 353716 ||  || — || September 19, 2001 || Kitt Peak || Spacewatch || — || align=right data-sort-value="0.62" | 620 m || 
|-id=717 bgcolor=#d6d6d6
| 353717 ||  || — || January 20, 2007 || Charleston || ARO || — || align=right | 3.7 km || 
|-id=718 bgcolor=#d6d6d6
| 353718 ||  || — || October 27, 2006 || Mount Lemmon || Mount Lemmon Survey || — || align=right | 2.4 km || 
|-id=719 bgcolor=#d6d6d6
| 353719 ||  || — || September 13, 1996 || Kitt Peak || Spacewatch || — || align=right | 2.2 km || 
|-id=720 bgcolor=#d6d6d6
| 353720 ||  || — || February 13, 2008 || Kitt Peak || Spacewatch || — || align=right | 4.3 km || 
|-id=721 bgcolor=#C2FFFF
| 353721 ||  || — || November 1, 2010 || Mount Lemmon || Mount Lemmon Survey || L4 || align=right | 9.8 km || 
|-id=722 bgcolor=#d6d6d6
| 353722 ||  || — || September 26, 2006 || Kitt Peak || Spacewatch || CHA || align=right | 2.3 km || 
|-id=723 bgcolor=#d6d6d6
| 353723 ||  || — || April 22, 2009 || Mount Lemmon || Mount Lemmon Survey || — || align=right | 3.8 km || 
|-id=724 bgcolor=#E9E9E9
| 353724 ||  || — || February 20, 2009 || Mount Lemmon || Mount Lemmon Survey || — || align=right | 1.8 km || 
|-id=725 bgcolor=#E9E9E9
| 353725 ||  || — || January 19, 2004 || Kitt Peak || Spacewatch || — || align=right | 1.5 km || 
|-id=726 bgcolor=#E9E9E9
| 353726 ||  || — || May 19, 2005 || Mount Lemmon || Mount Lemmon Survey || PAD || align=right | 3.1 km || 
|-id=727 bgcolor=#C2FFFF
| 353727 ||  || — || September 18, 2010 || Mount Lemmon || Mount Lemmon Survey || L4 || align=right | 7.4 km || 
|-id=728 bgcolor=#d6d6d6
| 353728 ||  || — || September 23, 2005 || Kitt Peak || Spacewatch || — || align=right | 4.0 km || 
|-id=729 bgcolor=#d6d6d6
| 353729 ||  || — || March 10, 2008 || Mount Lemmon || Mount Lemmon Survey || — || align=right | 4.0 km || 
|-id=730 bgcolor=#d6d6d6
| 353730 ||  || — || November 24, 2005 || Mauna Kea || P. A. Wiegert || — || align=right | 4.9 km || 
|-id=731 bgcolor=#d6d6d6
| 353731 ||  || — || August 29, 1995 || La Silla || C.-I. Lagerkvist || — || align=right | 3.1 km || 
|-id=732 bgcolor=#d6d6d6
| 353732 ||  || — || September 27, 2006 || Mount Lemmon || Mount Lemmon Survey || — || align=right | 2.4 km || 
|-id=733 bgcolor=#E9E9E9
| 353733 ||  || — || August 21, 2006 || Kitt Peak || Spacewatch || — || align=right | 1.9 km || 
|-id=734 bgcolor=#d6d6d6
| 353734 ||  || — || February 9, 2008 || Mount Lemmon || Mount Lemmon Survey || EOS || align=right | 2.3 km || 
|-id=735 bgcolor=#d6d6d6
| 353735 ||  || — || February 13, 2008 || Mount Lemmon || Mount Lemmon Survey || EOS || align=right | 2.7 km || 
|-id=736 bgcolor=#E9E9E9
| 353736 ||  || — || March 17, 2005 || Mount Lemmon || Mount Lemmon Survey || MAR || align=right data-sort-value="0.93" | 930 m || 
|-id=737 bgcolor=#C2FFFF
| 353737 ||  || — || November 12, 2010 || Mount Lemmon || Mount Lemmon Survey || L4 || align=right | 13 km || 
|-id=738 bgcolor=#C2FFFF
| 353738 ||  || — || November 20, 2011 || Kitt Peak || Spacewatch || L4 || align=right | 13 km || 
|-id=739 bgcolor=#C2FFFF
| 353739 ||  || — || September 27, 2009 || Mount Lemmon || Mount Lemmon Survey || L4 || align=right | 9.2 km || 
|-id=740 bgcolor=#C2FFFF
| 353740 ||  || — || October 12, 2010 || Mount Lemmon || Mount Lemmon Survey || L4ERY || align=right | 8.5 km || 
|-id=741 bgcolor=#d6d6d6
| 353741 ||  || — || November 28, 2005 || Kitt Peak || Spacewatch || — || align=right | 4.7 km || 
|-id=742 bgcolor=#C2FFFF
| 353742 ||  || — || November 24, 2011 || Haleakala || Pan-STARRS || L4 || align=right | 12 km || 
|-id=743 bgcolor=#C2FFFF
| 353743 ||  || — || September 29, 2009 || Mount Lemmon || Mount Lemmon Survey || L4ERY || align=right | 10 km || 
|-id=744 bgcolor=#C2FFFF
| 353744 ||  || — || December 2, 2010 || Mount Lemmon || Mount Lemmon Survey || L4ERY || align=right | 9.0 km || 
|-id=745 bgcolor=#d6d6d6
| 353745 ||  || — || October 23, 2011 || Haleakala || Pan-STARRS || — || align=right | 3.5 km || 
|-id=746 bgcolor=#d6d6d6
| 353746 ||  || — || February 7, 2008 || Mount Lemmon || Mount Lemmon Survey || — || align=right | 2.6 km || 
|-id=747 bgcolor=#C2FFFF
| 353747 ||  || — || October 14, 2009 || Mount Lemmon || Mount Lemmon Survey || L4 || align=right | 11 km || 
|-id=748 bgcolor=#C2FFFF
| 353748 ||  || — || October 1, 2009 || Mount Lemmon || Mount Lemmon Survey || L4 || align=right | 9.2 km || 
|-id=749 bgcolor=#C2FFFF
| 353749 ||  || — || May 19, 2004 || Kitt Peak || Spacewatch || L4 || align=right | 12 km || 
|-id=750 bgcolor=#E9E9E9
| 353750 ||  || — || December 17, 2003 || Anderson Mesa || LONEOS || — || align=right | 1.6 km || 
|-id=751 bgcolor=#d6d6d6
| 353751 ||  || — || January 27, 2007 || Kitt Peak || Spacewatch || — || align=right | 2.8 km || 
|-id=752 bgcolor=#d6d6d6
| 353752 ||  || — || December 6, 2005 || Kitt Peak || Spacewatch || — || align=right | 4.4 km || 
|-id=753 bgcolor=#C2FFFF
| 353753 ||  || — || September 24, 2008 || Mount Lemmon || Mount Lemmon Survey || L4 || align=right | 9.2 km || 
|-id=754 bgcolor=#d6d6d6
| 353754 ||  || — || January 27, 2007 || Kitt Peak || Spacewatch || — || align=right | 2.9 km || 
|-id=755 bgcolor=#C2FFFF
| 353755 ||  || — || September 9, 2008 || Mount Lemmon || Mount Lemmon Survey || L4 || align=right | 8.3 km || 
|-id=756 bgcolor=#d6d6d6
| 353756 ||  || — || March 6, 2002 || Palomar || NEAT || — || align=right | 3.3 km || 
|-id=757 bgcolor=#fefefe
| 353757 ||  || — || December 5, 2007 || Kitt Peak || Spacewatch || V || align=right data-sort-value="0.68" | 680 m || 
|-id=758 bgcolor=#d6d6d6
| 353758 ||  || — || April 5, 2003 || Kitt Peak || Spacewatch || KOR || align=right | 2.1 km || 
|-id=759 bgcolor=#d6d6d6
| 353759 ||  || — || February 1, 1995 || Kitt Peak || Spacewatch || VER || align=right | 4.0 km || 
|-id=760 bgcolor=#d6d6d6
| 353760 ||  || — || September 24, 2003 || Palomar || NEAT || — || align=right | 4.0 km || 
|-id=761 bgcolor=#C2FFFF
| 353761 ||  || — || September 11, 2007 || Mount Lemmon || Mount Lemmon Survey || L4 || align=right | 8.8 km || 
|-id=762 bgcolor=#d6d6d6
| 353762 ||  || — || January 19, 2001 || Kitt Peak || Spacewatch || — || align=right | 3.6 km || 
|-id=763 bgcolor=#fefefe
| 353763 ||  || — || March 24, 2004 || Siding Spring || SSS || H || align=right data-sort-value="0.84" | 840 m || 
|-id=764 bgcolor=#E9E9E9
| 353764 ||  || — || November 6, 2005 || Mount Lemmon || Mount Lemmon Survey || NEM || align=right | 3.1 km || 
|-id=765 bgcolor=#d6d6d6
| 353765 ||  || — || January 27, 2000 || Kitt Peak || Spacewatch || THM || align=right | 2.9 km || 
|-id=766 bgcolor=#fefefe
| 353766 ||  || — || June 5, 2005 || Junk Bond || D. Healy || NYS || align=right data-sort-value="0.81" | 810 m || 
|-id=767 bgcolor=#E9E9E9
| 353767 ||  || — || December 27, 2006 || Mount Lemmon || Mount Lemmon Survey || — || align=right | 1.8 km || 
|-id=768 bgcolor=#d6d6d6
| 353768 ||  || — || November 10, 2004 || Kitt Peak || Spacewatch || TEL || align=right | 2.0 km || 
|-id=769 bgcolor=#fefefe
| 353769 ||  || — || October 19, 1999 || Kitt Peak || Spacewatch || MAS || align=right data-sort-value="0.69" | 690 m || 
|-id=770 bgcolor=#d6d6d6
| 353770 ||  || — || April 24, 2001 || Kitt Peak || Spacewatch || LIX || align=right | 4.7 km || 
|-id=771 bgcolor=#fefefe
| 353771 ||  || — || December 3, 2007 || Kitt Peak || Spacewatch || — || align=right | 1.0 km || 
|-id=772 bgcolor=#fefefe
| 353772 ||  || — || January 11, 2008 || Mount Lemmon || Mount Lemmon Survey || NYS || align=right data-sort-value="0.82" | 820 m || 
|-id=773 bgcolor=#fefefe
| 353773 ||  || — || April 11, 2005 || Kitt Peak || Spacewatch || — || align=right data-sort-value="0.91" | 910 m || 
|-id=774 bgcolor=#d6d6d6
| 353774 ||  || — || March 13, 2007 || Mount Lemmon || Mount Lemmon Survey || TEL || align=right | 1.8 km || 
|-id=775 bgcolor=#d6d6d6
| 353775 ||  || — || January 26, 2006 || Mount Lemmon || Mount Lemmon Survey || — || align=right | 3.0 km || 
|-id=776 bgcolor=#d6d6d6
| 353776 ||  || — || January 31, 2006 || Catalina || CSS || — || align=right | 3.0 km || 
|-id=777 bgcolor=#E9E9E9
| 353777 ||  || — || October 23, 2001 || Palomar || NEAT || — || align=right | 2.2 km || 
|-id=778 bgcolor=#d6d6d6
| 353778 ||  || — || August 28, 2003 || Palomar || NEAT || EOS || align=right | 2.8 km || 
|-id=779 bgcolor=#d6d6d6
| 353779 ||  || — || January 18, 2004 || Palomar || NEAT || 7:4 || align=right | 5.3 km || 
|-id=780 bgcolor=#fefefe
| 353780 ||  || — || April 12, 2002 || Socorro || LINEAR || — || align=right data-sort-value="0.78" | 780 m || 
|-id=781 bgcolor=#E9E9E9
| 353781 ||  || — || May 29, 2008 || Mount Lemmon || Mount Lemmon Survey || — || align=right | 1.7 km || 
|-id=782 bgcolor=#fefefe
| 353782 ||  || — || November 17, 2006 || Mount Lemmon || Mount Lemmon Survey || V || align=right data-sort-value="0.66" | 660 m || 
|-id=783 bgcolor=#fefefe
| 353783 ||  || — || April 7, 2005 || Kitt Peak || Spacewatch || — || align=right data-sort-value="0.91" | 910 m || 
|-id=784 bgcolor=#d6d6d6
| 353784 ||  || — || July 6, 1997 || Kitt Peak || Spacewatch || — || align=right | 2.9 km || 
|-id=785 bgcolor=#E9E9E9
| 353785 ||  || — || October 7, 2004 || Palomar || NEAT || GEF || align=right | 2.0 km || 
|-id=786 bgcolor=#d6d6d6
| 353786 ||  || — || August 24, 2001 || Anderson Mesa || LONEOS || — || align=right | 4.6 km || 
|-id=787 bgcolor=#fefefe
| 353787 ||  || — || June 29, 2001 || Kitt Peak || Spacewatch || PHO || align=right | 1.8 km || 
|-id=788 bgcolor=#E9E9E9
| 353788 ||  || — || September 30, 1999 || Catalina || CSS || — || align=right | 2.2 km || 
|-id=789 bgcolor=#E9E9E9
| 353789 ||  || — || September 8, 1999 || Socorro || LINEAR || — || align=right | 2.4 km || 
|-id=790 bgcolor=#fefefe
| 353790 ||  || — || November 21, 2009 || Kitt Peak || Spacewatch || NYS || align=right | 1.00 km || 
|-id=791 bgcolor=#d6d6d6
| 353791 ||  || — || September 24, 1992 || Kitt Peak || Spacewatch || KOR || align=right | 1.6 km || 
|-id=792 bgcolor=#fefefe
| 353792 ||  || — || February 23, 2007 || Mount Lemmon || Mount Lemmon Survey || NYS || align=right data-sort-value="0.93" | 930 m || 
|-id=793 bgcolor=#d6d6d6
| 353793 ||  || — || September 19, 1995 || Kitt Peak || Spacewatch || — || align=right | 3.5 km || 
|-id=794 bgcolor=#E9E9E9
| 353794 ||  || — || September 17, 2003 || Kitt Peak || Spacewatch || HNS || align=right | 1.5 km || 
|-id=795 bgcolor=#fefefe
| 353795 ||  || — || December 28, 2005 || Catalina || CSS || — || align=right | 1.5 km || 
|-id=796 bgcolor=#C2FFFF
| 353796 ||  || — || September 6, 2012 || Mount Lemmon || Mount Lemmon Survey || L5 || align=right | 13 km || 
|-id=797 bgcolor=#d6d6d6
| 353797 ||  || — || April 12, 2005 || Mount Lemmon || Mount Lemmon Survey || ITH || align=right | 1.7 km || 
|-id=798 bgcolor=#d6d6d6
| 353798 ||  || — || January 31, 1998 || Kitt Peak || Spacewatch || — || align=right | 5.0 km || 
|-id=799 bgcolor=#E9E9E9
| 353799 ||  || — || September 23, 2008 || Catalina || CSS || — || align=right | 1.3 km || 
|-id=800 bgcolor=#d6d6d6
| 353800 ||  || — || October 23, 2001 || Palomar || NEAT || — || align=right | 3.7 km || 
|}

353801–353900 

|-bgcolor=#C2FFFF
| 353801 ||  || — || October 5, 2000 || Kitt Peak || Spacewatch || L5 || align=right | 8.9 km || 
|-id=802 bgcolor=#E9E9E9
| 353802 ||  || — || October 20, 1995 || Kitt Peak || Spacewatch || — || align=right | 1.7 km || 
|-id=803 bgcolor=#d6d6d6
| 353803 ||  || — || March 20, 1999 || Apache Point || SDSS || EOS || align=right | 2.4 km || 
|-id=804 bgcolor=#d6d6d6
| 353804 ||  || — || September 14, 2007 || Mount Lemmon || Mount Lemmon Survey || KOR || align=right | 1.4 km || 
|-id=805 bgcolor=#E9E9E9
| 353805 ||  || — || September 19, 2003 || Palomar || NEAT || 526 || align=right | 2.3 km || 
|-id=806 bgcolor=#E9E9E9
| 353806 ||  || — || October 23, 2003 || Haleakala || NEAT || WIT || align=right | 1.3 km || 
|-id=807 bgcolor=#fefefe
| 353807 ||  || — || December 10, 2005 || Kitt Peak || Spacewatch || NYS || align=right data-sort-value="0.68" | 680 m || 
|-id=808 bgcolor=#fefefe
| 353808 ||  || — || August 29, 2005 || Kitt Peak || Spacewatch || — || align=right data-sort-value="0.88" | 880 m || 
|-id=809 bgcolor=#E9E9E9
| 353809 ||  || — || September 29, 2008 || Mount Lemmon || Mount Lemmon Survey || — || align=right | 1.7 km || 
|-id=810 bgcolor=#fefefe
| 353810 ||  || — || September 12, 2001 || Kitt Peak || M. W. Buie || MAS || align=right data-sort-value="0.83" | 830 m || 
|-id=811 bgcolor=#fefefe
| 353811 ||  || — || December 14, 2001 || Socorro || LINEAR || — || align=right data-sort-value="0.91" | 910 m || 
|-id=812 bgcolor=#E9E9E9
| 353812 ||  || — || May 23, 2006 || Mount Lemmon || Mount Lemmon Survey || — || align=right | 1.7 km || 
|-id=813 bgcolor=#d6d6d6
| 353813 ||  || — || February 13, 2010 || WISE || WISE || — || align=right | 5.6 km || 
|-id=814 bgcolor=#E9E9E9
| 353814 ||  || — || October 20, 2003 || Kitt Peak || Spacewatch || HEN || align=right | 1.1 km || 
|-id=815 bgcolor=#fefefe
| 353815 ||  || — || August 12, 2001 || Palomar || NEAT || — || align=right | 1.1 km || 
|-id=816 bgcolor=#d6d6d6
| 353816 ||  || — || December 28, 2002 || Kitt Peak || Spacewatch || EOS || align=right | 2.2 km || 
|-id=817 bgcolor=#fefefe
| 353817 ||  || — || September 17, 1995 || Kitt Peak || Spacewatch || — || align=right data-sort-value="0.63" | 630 m || 
|-id=818 bgcolor=#d6d6d6
| 353818 ||  || — || April 4, 2005 || Mount Lemmon || Mount Lemmon Survey || — || align=right | 2.7 km || 
|-id=819 bgcolor=#E9E9E9
| 353819 ||  || — || August 21, 2007 || Anderson Mesa || LONEOS || DOR || align=right | 2.6 km || 
|-id=820 bgcolor=#d6d6d6
| 353820 ||  || — || March 6, 2003 || Anderson Mesa || LONEOS || — || align=right | 3.3 km || 
|-id=821 bgcolor=#d6d6d6
| 353821 ||  || — || January 26, 2003 || Anderson Mesa || LONEOS || — || align=right | 4.8 km || 
|-id=822 bgcolor=#E9E9E9
| 353822 ||  || — || July 8, 2003 || Palomar || NEAT || — || align=right | 2.5 km || 
|-id=823 bgcolor=#E9E9E9
| 353823 ||  || — || August 10, 1994 || La Silla || E. W. Elst || — || align=right | 1.6 km || 
|-id=824 bgcolor=#E9E9E9
| 353824 ||  || — || October 25, 2008 || Kitt Peak || Spacewatch || — || align=right | 1.1 km || 
|-id=825 bgcolor=#fefefe
| 353825 ||  || — || October 9, 1999 || Kitt Peak || Spacewatch || — || align=right data-sort-value="0.70" | 700 m || 
|-id=826 bgcolor=#d6d6d6
| 353826 ||  || — || August 18, 2006 || Palomar || NEAT || — || align=right | 4.3 km || 
|-id=827 bgcolor=#d6d6d6
| 353827 ||  || — || August 24, 2007 || Kitt Peak || Spacewatch || — || align=right | 2.9 km || 
|-id=828 bgcolor=#E9E9E9
| 353828 ||  || — || November 16, 2003 || Kitt Peak || Spacewatch || — || align=right | 1.6 km || 
|-id=829 bgcolor=#d6d6d6
| 353829 ||  || — || December 18, 2007 || Kitt Peak || Spacewatch || — || align=right | 3.0 km || 
|-id=830 bgcolor=#d6d6d6
| 353830 ||  || — || September 14, 2006 || Palomar || NEAT || EOS || align=right | 2.4 km || 
|-id=831 bgcolor=#E9E9E9
| 353831 ||  || — || May 20, 2006 || Mount Lemmon || Mount Lemmon Survey || — || align=right | 2.2 km || 
|-id=832 bgcolor=#E9E9E9
| 353832 ||  || — || January 13, 2005 || Kitt Peak || Spacewatch || — || align=right | 1.7 km || 
|-id=833 bgcolor=#d6d6d6
| 353833 ||  || — || November 20, 2007 || Mount Lemmon || Mount Lemmon Survey || CHA || align=right | 2.0 km || 
|-id=834 bgcolor=#E9E9E9
| 353834 ||  || — || October 18, 2003 || Needville || Needville Obs. || — || align=right | 2.1 km || 
|-id=835 bgcolor=#d6d6d6
| 353835 ||  || — || September 19, 2001 || Apache Point || SDSS || — || align=right | 3.7 km || 
|-id=836 bgcolor=#E9E9E9
| 353836 ||  || — || December 14, 2003 || Kitt Peak || Spacewatch || — || align=right | 2.1 km || 
|-id=837 bgcolor=#E9E9E9
| 353837 ||  || — || March 13, 2005 || Kitt Peak || Spacewatch || AGN || align=right | 1.4 km || 
|-id=838 bgcolor=#E9E9E9
| 353838 ||  || — || November 19, 2000 || Socorro || LINEAR || — || align=right | 1.5 km || 
|-id=839 bgcolor=#E9E9E9
| 353839 ||  || — || December 2, 2004 || Palomar || NEAT || — || align=right | 1.6 km || 
|-id=840 bgcolor=#d6d6d6
| 353840 ||  || — || March 7, 2003 || Apache Point || SDSS || EMA || align=right | 4.4 km || 
|-id=841 bgcolor=#E9E9E9
| 353841 ||  || — || December 10, 2004 || Kitt Peak || Spacewatch || — || align=right | 1.3 km || 
|-id=842 bgcolor=#E9E9E9
| 353842 ||  || — || November 19, 2003 || Kitt Peak || Spacewatch || — || align=right | 1.7 km || 
|-id=843 bgcolor=#d6d6d6
| 353843 ||  || — || September 19, 2006 || Catalina || CSS || — || align=right | 3.3 km || 
|-id=844 bgcolor=#d6d6d6
| 353844 ||  || — || February 2, 2009 || Mount Lemmon || Mount Lemmon Survey || — || align=right | 4.1 km || 
|-id=845 bgcolor=#d6d6d6
| 353845 ||  || — || October 19, 2006 || Catalina || CSS || — || align=right | 4.6 km || 
|-id=846 bgcolor=#E9E9E9
| 353846 ||  || — || November 21, 2003 || Socorro || LINEAR || — || align=right | 2.6 km || 
|-id=847 bgcolor=#E9E9E9
| 353847 ||  || — || October 21, 2003 || Palomar || NEAT || — || align=right | 2.4 km || 
|-id=848 bgcolor=#fefefe
| 353848 ||  || — || January 23, 2006 || Kitt Peak || Spacewatch || — || align=right | 1.1 km || 
|-id=849 bgcolor=#E9E9E9
| 353849 ||  || — || February 17, 2010 || Kitt Peak || Spacewatch || — || align=right | 2.0 km || 
|-id=850 bgcolor=#E9E9E9
| 353850 ||  || — || January 14, 2002 || Kitt Peak || Spacewatch || — || align=right | 1.4 km || 
|-id=851 bgcolor=#d6d6d6
| 353851 ||  || — || March 3, 2009 || Mount Lemmon || Mount Lemmon Survey || KOR || align=right | 1.7 km || 
|-id=852 bgcolor=#E9E9E9
| 353852 ||  || — || December 20, 1995 || Kitt Peak || Spacewatch || — || align=right | 2.0 km || 
|-id=853 bgcolor=#d6d6d6
| 353853 ||  || — || November 14, 2007 || Mount Lemmon || Mount Lemmon Survey || — || align=right | 3.5 km || 
|-id=854 bgcolor=#fefefe
| 353854 ||  || — || March 10, 2007 || Kitt Peak || Spacewatch || — || align=right data-sort-value="0.65" | 650 m || 
|-id=855 bgcolor=#fefefe
| 353855 ||  || — || October 6, 2008 || Kitt Peak || Spacewatch || NYS || align=right data-sort-value="0.68" | 680 m || 
|-id=856 bgcolor=#E9E9E9
| 353856 ||  || — || November 19, 2003 || Kitt Peak || Spacewatch || — || align=right | 1.9 km || 
|-id=857 bgcolor=#E9E9E9
| 353857 ||  || — || October 2, 2003 || Kitt Peak || Spacewatch || — || align=right | 1.8 km || 
|-id=858 bgcolor=#fefefe
| 353858 ||  || — || October 7, 2005 || Mount Lemmon || Mount Lemmon Survey || — || align=right data-sort-value="0.94" | 940 m || 
|-id=859 bgcolor=#E9E9E9
| 353859 ||  || — || January 30, 2009 || Catalina || CSS || JUN || align=right | 1.2 km || 
|-id=860 bgcolor=#fefefe
| 353860 ||  || — || December 7, 2005 || Kitt Peak || Spacewatch || — || align=right data-sort-value="0.88" | 880 m || 
|-id=861 bgcolor=#E9E9E9
| 353861 ||  || — || January 28, 2010 || WISE || WISE || — || align=right | 4.0 km || 
|-id=862 bgcolor=#d6d6d6
| 353862 ||  || — || August 15, 2006 || Siding Spring || SSS || — || align=right | 5.1 km || 
|-id=863 bgcolor=#E9E9E9
| 353863 ||  || — || May 25, 2006 || Mount Lemmon || Mount Lemmon Survey || — || align=right | 2.9 km || 
|-id=864 bgcolor=#d6d6d6
| 353864 ||  || — || October 19, 2006 || Catalina || CSS || — || align=right | 4.0 km || 
|-id=865 bgcolor=#d6d6d6
| 353865 ||  || — || November 9, 2007 || Kitt Peak || Spacewatch || — || align=right | 3.2 km || 
|-id=866 bgcolor=#d6d6d6
| 353866 ||  || — || October 13, 2001 || Kitt Peak || Spacewatch || — || align=right | 2.3 km || 
|-id=867 bgcolor=#E9E9E9
| 353867 ||  || — || November 11, 2004 || Kitt Peak || Spacewatch || — || align=right | 1.1 km || 
|-id=868 bgcolor=#fefefe
| 353868 ||  || — || September 12, 2001 || Kitt Peak || Spacewatch || NYS || align=right data-sort-value="0.48" | 480 m || 
|-id=869 bgcolor=#E9E9E9
| 353869 ||  || — || June 7, 2006 || Siding Spring || SSS || — || align=right | 2.7 km || 
|-id=870 bgcolor=#d6d6d6
| 353870 ||  || — || February 9, 2003 || Haleakala || NEAT || EMA || align=right | 5.4 km || 
|-id=871 bgcolor=#d6d6d6
| 353871 ||  || — || November 18, 2001 || Apache Point || SDSS || — || align=right | 2.9 km || 
|-id=872 bgcolor=#d6d6d6
| 353872 ||  || — || September 21, 2006 || Anderson Mesa || LONEOS || HYG || align=right | 2.7 km || 
|-id=873 bgcolor=#E9E9E9
| 353873 ||  || — || October 29, 2003 || Kitt Peak || Spacewatch || — || align=right | 2.1 km || 
|-id=874 bgcolor=#d6d6d6
| 353874 ||  || — || November 14, 2007 || Kitt Peak || Spacewatch || EOS || align=right | 2.6 km || 
|-id=875 bgcolor=#fefefe
| 353875 ||  || — || January 13, 2003 || Socorro || LINEAR || PHO || align=right | 1.1 km || 
|-id=876 bgcolor=#E9E9E9
| 353876 ||  || — || February 28, 2006 || Mount Lemmon || Mount Lemmon Survey || — || align=right | 1.5 km || 
|-id=877 bgcolor=#d6d6d6
| 353877 ||  || — || October 14, 2001 || Apache Point || SDSS || — || align=right | 3.0 km || 
|-id=878 bgcolor=#E9E9E9
| 353878 ||  || — || October 20, 2003 || Kitt Peak || Spacewatch || — || align=right | 3.1 km || 
|-id=879 bgcolor=#d6d6d6
| 353879 ||  || — || September 19, 1995 || Kitt Peak || Spacewatch || — || align=right | 3.8 km || 
|-id=880 bgcolor=#E9E9E9
| 353880 ||  || — || April 21, 2006 || Kitt Peak || Spacewatch || ADE || align=right | 2.3 km || 
|-id=881 bgcolor=#d6d6d6
| 353881 ||  || — || October 16, 2006 || Catalina || CSS || HYG || align=right | 3.5 km || 
|-id=882 bgcolor=#fefefe
| 353882 ||  || — || November 30, 2005 || Kitt Peak || Spacewatch || V || align=right data-sort-value="0.83" | 830 m || 
|-id=883 bgcolor=#E9E9E9
| 353883 ||  || — || May 23, 2003 || Kitt Peak || Spacewatch || — || align=right | 1.4 km || 
|-id=884 bgcolor=#E9E9E9
| 353884 ||  || — || September 2, 2002 || Kitt Peak || Spacewatch || AGN || align=right | 1.4 km || 
|-id=885 bgcolor=#d6d6d6
| 353885 ||  || — || May 7, 2010 || Mount Lemmon || Mount Lemmon Survey || EOS || align=right | 2.7 km || 
|-id=886 bgcolor=#d6d6d6
| 353886 ||  || — || December 31, 2002 || Socorro || LINEAR || — || align=right | 3.5 km || 
|-id=887 bgcolor=#E9E9E9
| 353887 ||  || — || September 11, 2007 || Mount Lemmon || Mount Lemmon Survey || — || align=right | 2.0 km || 
|-id=888 bgcolor=#E9E9E9
| 353888 ||  || — || November 21, 2008 || Kitt Peak || Spacewatch || — || align=right | 2.4 km || 
|-id=889 bgcolor=#d6d6d6
| 353889 ||  || — || December 18, 2001 || Socorro || LINEAR || — || align=right | 4.5 km || 
|-id=890 bgcolor=#d6d6d6
| 353890 ||  || — || January 27, 2004 || Kitt Peak || Spacewatch || KOR || align=right | 1.7 km || 
|-id=891 bgcolor=#d6d6d6
| 353891 ||  || — || December 30, 2007 || Kitt Peak || Spacewatch || — || align=right | 2.9 km || 
|-id=892 bgcolor=#d6d6d6
| 353892 ||  || — || March 19, 2009 || Catalina || CSS || — || align=right | 2.9 km || 
|-id=893 bgcolor=#d6d6d6
| 353893 ||  || — || December 14, 2007 || Mount Lemmon || Mount Lemmon Survey || HYG || align=right | 2.6 km || 
|-id=894 bgcolor=#d6d6d6
| 353894 ||  || — || November 19, 2001 || Socorro || LINEAR || — || align=right | 3.4 km || 
|-id=895 bgcolor=#d6d6d6
| 353895 ||  || — || May 8, 2005 || Mount Lemmon || Mount Lemmon Survey || KAR || align=right | 1.5 km || 
|-id=896 bgcolor=#d6d6d6
| 353896 ||  || — || October 14, 2001 || Kitt Peak || Spacewatch || THM || align=right | 2.1 km || 
|-id=897 bgcolor=#d6d6d6
| 353897 ||  || — || December 4, 2002 || Kitt Peak || M. W. Buie || — || align=right | 3.2 km || 
|-id=898 bgcolor=#d6d6d6
| 353898 ||  || — || August 30, 2005 || Palomar || NEAT || 7:4 || align=right | 4.6 km || 
|-id=899 bgcolor=#fefefe
| 353899 ||  || — || December 18, 2001 || Socorro || LINEAR || — || align=right | 1.2 km || 
|-id=900 bgcolor=#E9E9E9
| 353900 ||  || — || December 28, 2007 || Kitt Peak || Spacewatch || — || align=right | 2.9 km || 
|}

353901–354000 

|-bgcolor=#fefefe
| 353901 ||  || — || December 25, 1998 || Kitt Peak || Spacewatch || V || align=right data-sort-value="0.76" | 760 m || 
|-id=902 bgcolor=#fefefe
| 353902 ||  || — || June 23, 2007 || Kitt Peak || Spacewatch || — || align=right | 1.1 km || 
|-id=903 bgcolor=#d6d6d6
| 353903 ||  || — || August 30, 2011 || Haleakala || Pan-STARRS || EOS || align=right | 2.7 km || 
|-id=904 bgcolor=#d6d6d6
| 353904 ||  || — || January 13, 2002 || Socorro || LINEAR || — || align=right | 4.1 km || 
|-id=905 bgcolor=#E9E9E9
| 353905 ||  || — || February 2, 2005 || Kitt Peak || Spacewatch || — || align=right | 1.7 km || 
|-id=906 bgcolor=#d6d6d6
| 353906 ||  || — || August 21, 2006 || Kitt Peak || Spacewatch || — || align=right | 3.2 km || 
|-id=907 bgcolor=#E9E9E9
| 353907 ||  || — || February 4, 2009 || Mount Lemmon || Mount Lemmon Survey || — || align=right | 2.8 km || 
|-id=908 bgcolor=#E9E9E9
| 353908 ||  || — || April 17, 2005 || Kitt Peak || Spacewatch || — || align=right | 1.5 km || 
|-id=909 bgcolor=#fefefe
| 353909 ||  || — || November 30, 2005 || Kitt Peak || Spacewatch || V || align=right data-sort-value="0.61" | 610 m || 
|-id=910 bgcolor=#fefefe
| 353910 ||  || — || September 23, 2005 || Kitt Peak || Spacewatch || FLO || align=right data-sort-value="0.56" | 560 m || 
|-id=911 bgcolor=#E9E9E9
| 353911 ||  || — || November 20, 2000 || Socorro || LINEAR || — || align=right | 1.2 km || 
|-id=912 bgcolor=#fefefe
| 353912 ||  || — || April 11, 1996 || Kitt Peak || Spacewatch || FLO || align=right data-sort-value="0.78" | 780 m || 
|-id=913 bgcolor=#d6d6d6
| 353913 ||  || — || October 11, 2001 || Socorro || LINEAR || — || align=right | 3.6 km || 
|-id=914 bgcolor=#d6d6d6
| 353914 ||  || — || October 10, 2002 || Apache Point || SDSS || — || align=right | 2.6 km || 
|-id=915 bgcolor=#E9E9E9
| 353915 ||  || — || February 27, 2006 || Kitt Peak || Spacewatch || — || align=right | 1.4 km || 
|-id=916 bgcolor=#E9E9E9
| 353916 ||  || — || January 15, 2005 || Kitt Peak || Spacewatch || — || align=right | 1.7 km || 
|-id=917 bgcolor=#d6d6d6
| 353917 ||  || — || December 12, 1996 || Kitt Peak || Spacewatch || — || align=right | 4.4 km || 
|-id=918 bgcolor=#E9E9E9
| 353918 ||  || — || June 21, 2007 || Mount Lemmon || Mount Lemmon Survey || — || align=right | 1.3 km || 
|-id=919 bgcolor=#d6d6d6
| 353919 ||  || — || January 10, 2002 || Palomar || NEAT || — || align=right | 3.5 km || 
|-id=920 bgcolor=#E9E9E9
| 353920 ||  || — || September 20, 1995 || Kitt Peak || Spacewatch || — || align=right data-sort-value="0.94" | 940 m || 
|-id=921 bgcolor=#fefefe
| 353921 ||  || — || February 20, 2006 || Catalina || CSS || V || align=right data-sort-value="0.85" | 850 m || 
|-id=922 bgcolor=#d6d6d6
| 353922 ||  || — || November 18, 2007 || Mount Lemmon || Mount Lemmon Survey || — || align=right | 4.6 km || 
|-id=923 bgcolor=#fefefe
| 353923 ||  || — || September 24, 1960 || Palomar || PLS || NYS || align=right data-sort-value="0.65" | 650 m || 
|-id=924 bgcolor=#fefefe
| 353924 ||  || — || September 24, 1960 || Palomar || PLS || NYS || align=right data-sort-value="0.76" | 760 m || 
|-id=925 bgcolor=#E9E9E9
| 353925 ||  || — || September 29, 1973 || Palomar || PLS || — || align=right | 1.6 km || 
|-id=926 bgcolor=#fefefe
| 353926 ||  || — || October 17, 1977 || Palomar || PLS || — || align=right data-sort-value="0.99" | 990 m || 
|-id=927 bgcolor=#E9E9E9
| 353927 ||  || — || March 5, 1992 || Kitt Peak || Spacewatch || — || align=right | 1.7 km || 
|-id=928 bgcolor=#d6d6d6
| 353928 ||  || — || February 23, 1995 || Kitt Peak || Spacewatch || 7:4 || align=right | 5.9 km || 
|-id=929 bgcolor=#E9E9E9
| 353929 ||  || — || March 27, 1995 || Kitt Peak || Spacewatch || — || align=right | 2.7 km || 
|-id=930 bgcolor=#C2FFFF
| 353930 ||  || — || July 27, 1995 || Kitt Peak || Spacewatch || L4 || align=right | 8.4 km || 
|-id=931 bgcolor=#E9E9E9
| 353931 ||  || — || August 20, 1995 || Kitt Peak || Spacewatch || — || align=right data-sort-value="0.98" | 980 m || 
|-id=932 bgcolor=#d6d6d6
| 353932 ||  || — || November 16, 1995 || Kitt Peak || Spacewatch || — || align=right | 2.9 km || 
|-id=933 bgcolor=#d6d6d6
| 353933 ||  || — || November 17, 1995 || Kitt Peak || Spacewatch || — || align=right | 3.2 km || 
|-id=934 bgcolor=#d6d6d6
| 353934 ||  || — || November 21, 1995 || Kitt Peak || Spacewatch || THM || align=right | 2.3 km || 
|-id=935 bgcolor=#fefefe
| 353935 ||  || — || September 14, 1996 || Haleakala || NEAT || H || align=right | 1.0 km || 
|-id=936 bgcolor=#d6d6d6
| 353936 ||  || — || March 2, 1997 || Kitt Peak || Spacewatch || — || align=right | 5.6 km || 
|-id=937 bgcolor=#fefefe
| 353937 ||  || — || September 28, 1997 || Kitt Peak || Spacewatch || FLO || align=right data-sort-value="0.62" | 620 m || 
|-id=938 bgcolor=#FFC2E0
| 353938 ||  || — || August 23, 1998 || Socorro || LINEAR || AMO +1km || align=right data-sort-value="0.80" | 800 m || 
|-id=939 bgcolor=#E9E9E9
| 353939 ||  || — || August 23, 1998 || Anderson Mesa || LONEOS || — || align=right | 2.1 km || 
|-id=940 bgcolor=#fefefe
| 353940 ||  || — || August 24, 1998 || Socorro || LINEAR || — || align=right data-sort-value="0.94" | 940 m || 
|-id=941 bgcolor=#E9E9E9
| 353941 ||  || — || September 24, 1998 || Kitt Peak || Spacewatch || — || align=right data-sort-value="0.82" | 820 m || 
|-id=942 bgcolor=#fefefe
| 353942 ||  || — || September 22, 1998 || Anderson Mesa || LONEOS || — || align=right | 1.0 km || 
|-id=943 bgcolor=#E9E9E9
| 353943 ||  || — || October 15, 1998 || Catalina || CSS || — || align=right | 2.1 km || 
|-id=944 bgcolor=#fefefe
| 353944 ||  || — || December 8, 1998 || Kitt Peak || Spacewatch || — || align=right data-sort-value="0.72" | 720 m || 
|-id=945 bgcolor=#E9E9E9
| 353945 ||  || — || December 20, 1998 || Kitt Peak || Spacewatch || — || align=right | 1.9 km || 
|-id=946 bgcolor=#E9E9E9
| 353946 ||  || — || December 22, 1998 || Kitt Peak || Spacewatch || PAD || align=right | 1.9 km || 
|-id=947 bgcolor=#FFC2E0
| 353947 ||  || — || February 9, 1999 || Socorro || LINEAR || APO || align=right data-sort-value="0.62" | 620 m || 
|-id=948 bgcolor=#fefefe
| 353948 ||  || — || March 18, 1999 || Kitt Peak || Spacewatch || — || align=right data-sort-value="0.64" | 640 m || 
|-id=949 bgcolor=#fefefe
| 353949 ||  || — || March 21, 1999 || Apache Point || SDSS || — || align=right data-sort-value="0.88" | 880 m || 
|-id=950 bgcolor=#fefefe
| 353950 ||  || — || September 8, 1999 || Socorro || LINEAR || PHO || align=right | 2.4 km || 
|-id=951 bgcolor=#E9E9E9
| 353951 ||  || — || September 6, 1999 || Catalina || CSS || GER || align=right | 1.8 km || 
|-id=952 bgcolor=#d6d6d6
| 353952 ||  || — || September 7, 1999 || Socorro || LINEAR || — || align=right | 4.2 km || 
|-id=953 bgcolor=#d6d6d6
| 353953 ||  || — || September 30, 1999 || Kitt Peak || Spacewatch || — || align=right | 3.5 km || 
|-id=954 bgcolor=#d6d6d6
| 353954 ||  || — || October 10, 1999 || Kitt Peak || Spacewatch || EOS || align=right | 2.2 km || 
|-id=955 bgcolor=#E9E9E9
| 353955 ||  || — || October 15, 1999 || Kitt Peak || Spacewatch || RAF || align=right data-sort-value="0.98" | 980 m || 
|-id=956 bgcolor=#fefefe
| 353956 ||  || — || October 5, 1999 || Catalina || CSS || H || align=right data-sort-value="0.87" | 870 m || 
|-id=957 bgcolor=#d6d6d6
| 353957 ||  || — || October 15, 1999 || Kitt Peak || Spacewatch || — || align=right | 3.7 km || 
|-id=958 bgcolor=#d6d6d6
| 353958 ||  || — || October 4, 1999 || Kitt Peak || Spacewatch || — || align=right | 2.8 km || 
|-id=959 bgcolor=#FA8072
| 353959 ||  || — || October 31, 1999 || Kitt Peak || Spacewatch || — || align=right | 1.2 km || 
|-id=960 bgcolor=#E9E9E9
| 353960 ||  || — || October 16, 1999 || Socorro || LINEAR || — || align=right data-sort-value="0.76" | 760 m || 
|-id=961 bgcolor=#E9E9E9
| 353961 ||  || — || November 4, 1999 || Socorro || LINEAR || ADE || align=right | 2.4 km || 
|-id=962 bgcolor=#E9E9E9
| 353962 ||  || — || November 4, 1999 || Socorro || LINEAR || BRG || align=right | 1.6 km || 
|-id=963 bgcolor=#E9E9E9
| 353963 ||  || — || October 4, 1999 || Catalina || CSS || — || align=right | 1.2 km || 
|-id=964 bgcolor=#E9E9E9
| 353964 ||  || — || November 10, 1999 || Kitt Peak || Spacewatch || — || align=right data-sort-value="0.86" | 860 m || 
|-id=965 bgcolor=#d6d6d6
| 353965 ||  || — || November 29, 1999 || Kitt Peak || Spacewatch || — || align=right | 4.3 km || 
|-id=966 bgcolor=#E9E9E9
| 353966 ||  || — || December 7, 1999 || Socorro || LINEAR || — || align=right | 1.1 km || 
|-id=967 bgcolor=#FA8072
| 353967 ||  || — || December 12, 1999 || Catalina || CSS || — || align=right | 2.9 km || 
|-id=968 bgcolor=#fefefe
| 353968 ||  || — || December 15, 1999 || Kitt Peak || Spacewatch || H || align=right | 1.1 km || 
|-id=969 bgcolor=#E9E9E9
| 353969 ||  || — || December 3, 1999 || Kitt Peak || Spacewatch || — || align=right | 1.2 km || 
|-id=970 bgcolor=#E9E9E9
| 353970 ||  || — || December 28, 1999 || Socorro || LINEAR || — || align=right | 1.7 km || 
|-id=971 bgcolor=#C2FFFF
| 353971 ||  || — || January 5, 2000 || Kitt Peak || Spacewatch || L4 || align=right | 15 km || 
|-id=972 bgcolor=#E9E9E9
| 353972 ||  || — || January 8, 2000 || Kitt Peak || Spacewatch || — || align=right | 1.6 km || 
|-id=973 bgcolor=#E9E9E9
| 353973 ||  || — || January 27, 2000 || Kitt Peak || Spacewatch || — || align=right | 1.5 km || 
|-id=974 bgcolor=#fefefe
| 353974 ||  || — || February 2, 2000 || Socorro || LINEAR || H || align=right | 1.1 km || 
|-id=975 bgcolor=#fefefe
| 353975 ||  || — || February 6, 2000 || Socorro || LINEAR || — || align=right | 1.9 km || 
|-id=976 bgcolor=#E9E9E9
| 353976 ||  || — || February 5, 2000 || Kitt Peak || M. W. Buie || HEN || align=right data-sort-value="0.88" | 880 m || 
|-id=977 bgcolor=#E9E9E9
| 353977 ||  || — || February 3, 2000 || Kitt Peak || Spacewatch || RAF || align=right | 1.1 km || 
|-id=978 bgcolor=#E9E9E9
| 353978 ||  || — || February 29, 2000 || Socorro || LINEAR || — || align=right | 2.1 km || 
|-id=979 bgcolor=#E9E9E9
| 353979 ||  || — || February 29, 2000 || Socorro || LINEAR || EUN || align=right | 1.5 km || 
|-id=980 bgcolor=#E9E9E9
| 353980 ||  || — || March 3, 2000 || Socorro || LINEAR || — || align=right | 2.4 km || 
|-id=981 bgcolor=#E9E9E9
| 353981 ||  || — || March 3, 2000 || Socorro || LINEAR || — || align=right | 1.7 km || 
|-id=982 bgcolor=#FA8072
| 353982 ||  || — || March 2, 2000 || Catalina || CSS || — || align=right | 1.4 km || 
|-id=983 bgcolor=#fefefe
| 353983 ||  || — || April 5, 2000 || Socorro || LINEAR || — || align=right data-sort-value="0.74" | 740 m || 
|-id=984 bgcolor=#E9E9E9
| 353984 ||  || — || April 3, 2000 || Socorro || LINEAR || — || align=right | 2.1 km || 
|-id=985 bgcolor=#FA8072
| 353985 ||  || — || May 7, 2000 || Socorro || LINEAR || — || align=right data-sort-value="0.72" | 720 m || 
|-id=986 bgcolor=#fefefe
| 353986 ||  || — || June 4, 2000 || Socorro || LINEAR || — || align=right | 1.0 km || 
|-id=987 bgcolor=#FA8072
| 353987 ||  || — || July 30, 2000 || Socorro || LINEAR || — || align=right | 1.0 km || 
|-id=988 bgcolor=#fefefe
| 353988 ||  || — || August 25, 2000 || Socorro || LINEAR || ERI || align=right | 1.9 km || 
|-id=989 bgcolor=#fefefe
| 353989 ||  || — || August 25, 2000 || Cerro Tololo || M. W. Buie || MAS || align=right data-sort-value="0.59" | 590 m || 
|-id=990 bgcolor=#fefefe
| 353990 ||  || — || August 25, 2000 || Cerro Tololo || M. W. Buie || MAS || align=right data-sort-value="0.65" | 650 m || 
|-id=991 bgcolor=#d6d6d6
| 353991 ||  || — || September 1, 2000 || Socorro || LINEAR || — || align=right | 4.5 km || 
|-id=992 bgcolor=#fefefe
| 353992 ||  || — || September 7, 2000 || Kitt Peak || Spacewatch || NYS || align=right data-sort-value="0.65" | 650 m || 
|-id=993 bgcolor=#d6d6d6
| 353993 ||  || — || September 23, 2000 || Socorro || LINEAR || — || align=right | 3.3 km || 
|-id=994 bgcolor=#fefefe
| 353994 ||  || — || September 24, 2000 || Socorro || LINEAR || — || align=right | 1.3 km || 
|-id=995 bgcolor=#d6d6d6
| 353995 ||  || — || September 4, 2000 || Anderson Mesa || LONEOS || — || align=right | 3.0 km || 
|-id=996 bgcolor=#fefefe
| 353996 ||  || — || September 24, 2000 || Socorro || LINEAR || NYS || align=right data-sort-value="0.76" | 760 m || 
|-id=997 bgcolor=#fefefe
| 353997 ||  || — || September 20, 2000 || Haleakala || NEAT || V || align=right data-sort-value="0.80" | 800 m || 
|-id=998 bgcolor=#fefefe
| 353998 ||  || — || September 25, 2000 || Socorro || LINEAR || — || align=right | 1.2 km || 
|-id=999 bgcolor=#fefefe
| 353999 ||  || — || September 24, 2000 || Socorro || LINEAR || — || align=right | 1.00 km || 
|-id=000 bgcolor=#fefefe
| 354000 ||  || — || September 27, 2000 || Kitt Peak || Spacewatch || — || align=right data-sort-value="0.78" | 780 m || 
|}

References

External links 
 Discovery Circumstances: Numbered Minor Planets (350001)–(355000) (IAU Minor Planet Center)

0353